= Martin Williams (environmental scientist) =

Welsh environmental scientist

Martin Lloyd Williams
- Born: 22 November 1947; Mountain Ash, Wales
- Died: 21 September 2020 (aged 72)
- Education: University College, Cardiff
- Known for: Air pollution
- Partner: Rosemary Hudleston
- Children: 2
- Scientific career
- Workplaces: Warren Spring Laboratory; Defra; Imperial College London

Martin Lloyd Williams (22 November 1947–21 September 2020) was a Welsh chemist and environmental scientist who made important contributions to the science of air pollution and its incorporation into public policy in the United Kingdom. Williams was one of the first scientists to recognize the harmful health effects of ground-level ozone, in papers published in Nature in the mid-1970s, and one of the first to study vehicle emissions in the real world (rather than under artificial laboratory conditions). He also established the first systematic programme to produce inventories of UK national air pollution emissions.

== Early life ==
Born in Mountain Ash, Williams studied chemistry at University College, Cardiff, took a Ph.D. at Bristol University, and held research fellowships at the University of British Columbia and the University of Bradford.

== Government career ==
In 1975, he became a government scientist at the Department of Industry's environmental research centre, Warren Spring Laboratory in Stevenage, and served as Head of the Air Pollution Division there, leading a team of 50 scientists, from 1982 to 1993. He moved to the UK government's Department of Environment in 1993. In 2005, he became head of the air quality and science programme at the Department for Environment, Food and Rural Affairs, where he focused on translating air pollution science into effective government policy, and developed three national air quality strategies for the UK.

== Academic career ==
In 2010, Williams returned to academia as a professor and Head of Science Policy and Epidemiology in the Environmental Research Group at King's College London, where his research interests included the air quality in London, the measureable health benefits of improved air quality, and the connections between climate change and air pollution. He was also a visiting professor at the University of Urbino, Italy.

== Other activities ==
Apart from his government and academic appointments, he was chair of the scientific arm of the UN Convention on Long-Range Transboundary Air Pollution (CLRTAP), co-chair of the World Health Organization (WHO) working group on air quality guidelines, an air quality adviser to the US Environmental Protection Agency, and a member of the UK government's two scientific, air pollution advisory committees (AQEG and COMEAP). In 2019, he became one of three Clean Air Champions (alongside Sir Stephen Holgate and Jenny Baverstock) appointed by the UK government's Clean Air programme, tasked with using scientific research to inform practical solutions to the problem of air pollution. Shortly before his death, the Institute of Air Quality Management invited him to be its inaugural Honorary Fellow.

Williams died in 2020 of the heart condition hemopericardium.

== Selected publications ==
- Irwin, J.G.; Williams, M.L. (1988). "Acid rain: Chemistry and transport". Environmental Pollution. 50 (1–2): 29–59. doi:10.1016/0269-7491(88)90184-4. ISSN 0269-7491. PMID 15092652.
- Müezzinoğlu, Aysen; Williams, Martin, eds. (1992). Industrial Air Pollution Assessment and Control: Proceedings of the NATO Advanced Study Institute on Industrial Air Pollution: Assessment and Control held at Akbük/Didim-Aydin, Turkey from April 29 to Mai 10, 1991. Berlin: Springer. ISBN 3540530983. OCLC 25164712.
- Williams, Martin (2009). "The Policy Response to Improving Air Quality". In Hester, Ronald; Harrison, Roy (eds.). Air Quality in Urban Environments. Great Britain: Royal Society of Chemistry. pp. 129–145. ISBN 9781847559074.
- Williams, Martin (April 2013). "Air Quality: Should we have achieved more?". environmental SCIENTIST. Institution of Environmental Sciences.
- Williams, Martin (2014). "Atmospheric Dispersal of Pollutants and the Modelling of Air Pollution". In Harrison, Roy (ed.). Pollution: Causes, Effects and Control. Great Britain: Royal Society of Chemistry. pp. 225–243. ISBN 9781894736480.
- Walton, Heather; Dajnak, David; Beevers, Sean; Williams, Martin; Watkiss, Paul; Hunt, Alistair (2015). Understanding the health impacts of air pollution in London. London: Transport for London/Greater London Authority/King's College, London.
- Fowler, David; Pyle, John; Sutton, Mark; Williams, Martin (2020). "Global Air Quality, past present and future: an introduction". Phil. Trans. R. Soc. A. 378 (2183). Bibcode:2020RSPTA.37890323F. doi:10.1098/rsta.2019.0323. PMC 7536034. PMID 32981444.
