= Frank Kelly (physiologist) =

British air pollution scientist

Frank Kelly CBE FRSB FRSC FMedSci
- Born: Northern Ireland
- Known for: Health effects of air pollution

Academic background
- Education: Queen's University Belfast

Academic work
- Discipline: Physiology
- Institutions: Pennsylvania State University; Southampton University; St Thomas’ Hospital; King's College London; Imperial College London
- Website: Official website

Francis J. Kelly is a British professor of community health and policy and Head of the Environmental Research Group (a global centre dedicated to air pollution research) at Imperial College London. He is an authority on the health effects of air pollution.

== Academic career and research ==
Kelly obtained his first degree from Queen's University Belfast, before taking a Ph.D. in physiology there as well. He then joined Pennsylvania State University, as a postdoctoral fellow. After working in the United States, he returned to the UK as a lecturer at Southampton University. During the early part of his career, his research focused on free-radical biology and human disease, and lung damage in premature babies and cystic fibrosis patients.

In 1992, Kelly moved to London and developed a new research interest in the effect of air pollution on lungs and respiratory health. He became a Senior Lecturer at St Thomas’ Hospital, where his research interests included the health effects of vitamin E, before moving to King's College, London, where he was Professor of Environmental Health and Director of the Environmental Research Group. Kelly and his group transferred to Imperial College in 2020. His current work includes WellHome, a large study of how indoor air pollutants affect childhood asthma in urban environments.

Kelly works with the World Health Organization on air pollution issues and is a member of the Health Effects Institute (HEI) Review Committee. He has also served as Chairman of the UK Department of Health Expert Committee on the Medical Effects of Air Pollutants (COMEAP), President of the European Society for Free Radical Research, and Chairman of the British Association for Lung Research.

Kelly has published more than 480 peer-reviewed papers.

== Awards ==
Kelly won the 2019 Royal Society of Chemistry Toxicology Award for "outstanding research into free radical and antioxidant toxicological mechanisms relevant to pulmonary toxicity". Also that year, he shared the Elsevier Haagen-Smit Prize with Julia Fussell for a paper on the toxicity of particulate air pollution. He was elected a Fellow of the Academy of Medical Sciences in 2018 and became an honorary fellow of the Institute of Air Quality Management in 2021. Kelly was made a CBE in January 2025 "for services to air pollution research and to human health".

== Media appearances ==
Kelly is a frequent media commentator on air quality issues, such as pollution in London, pollution caused by road transport, whether a shift to electric cars can tackle air quality, the use of taxes to improve air quality, indoor air pollution, air quality in other parts of the world, and the effectiveness of air pollution limits and guidelines.

== Selected publications ==
=== Books and reports ===
- Punchard, Neville; Kelly, Frank J (1996). Free Radicals: A Practical Approach. Oxford University Press. ISBN 9780199635603. OCLC 34476247.
- Kelly, Frank J; Meydani, Mohsen; Packer, Lester (2004). Vitamin E and Health. New York: New York Academy of Sciences. ISBN 9781573315272.
- Jarvis, Debbie; Adamkiewicz, Gary; Heroux, Marie-Eve; Rapp, Regula; Kelly, Frank J. (2010). WHO Guidelines for Indoor Air Quality: Selected Pollutants: Nitrogen Dioxide. Geneva: World Health Organization.
- Kelly, Frank; Anderson, H. Ross; Armstrong, Ben; Atkinson, Richard; Barratt, Ben; et al. (2011). The Impact of the Congestion Charging Scheme on Air Quality in London: Research Report 155 (PDF). Boston, Mass.: Health Effects Institute.

=== Scientific papers ===
- Stephens, N; Parsons, A; Brown, M; Schofield, P; Kelly, F; et al. (23 March 1996). "Randomised controlled trial of vitamin E in patients with coronary disease: Cambridge Heart Antioxidant Study (CHAOS)". The Lancet. 347 (9004): 781–786. doi:10.1016/s0140-6736(96)90866-1. PMID 8622332. S2CID 206009823.
- Chappell, Lucy C; Seed, Paul T; Briley, Annette L; Kelly, Frank J; Lee, Rosalind; et al. (September 1999). "Effect of antioxidants on the occurrence of pre-eclampsia in women at increased risk: a randomised trial". The Lancet. 354 (9181): 810–816. doi:10.1016/S0140-6736(99)80010-5. ISSN 0140-6736. PMID 10485722. S2CID 33161705.
- Salvi, Sundeep; Blomberg, Anders; Rudell, Bertil; Kelly, Frank; Sandström, Thomas; et al. (March 1999). "Acute Inflammatory Responses in the Airways and Peripheral Blood After Short-Term Exposure to Diesel Exhaust in Healthy Human Volunteers". American Journal of Respiratory and Critical Care Medicine. 159 (3): 702–709. doi:10.1164/ajrccm.159.3.9709083. eISSN 1535-4970. ISSN 1073-449X. PMID 10051240.
- Kelly, Frank (1 August 2003). "Oxidative stress: its role in air pollution and adverse health effects". Occupational and Environmental Medicine. 60 (8): 612–616. doi:10.1136/oem.60.8.612. PMC 1740593. PMID 12883027.
- Kelly, Frank; Fussell, Julia (2015). "Air pollution and public health: emerging hazards and improved understanding of risk". Environ. Geochem. Health. 37 (4): 631–49. Bibcode:2015EnvGH..37..631K. doi:10.1007/s10653-015-9720-1. PMC 4516868. PMID 26040976.
- Wright, Stephanie L; Kelly, Frank J (20 June 2017). "Plastic and human health: a micro issue?". Environmental Science & Technology. 51 (12): 6634–6647. Bibcode:2017EnST...51.6634W. doi:10.1021/acs.est.7b00423. PMID 28531345.
- Kelly, Frank (2023). "8: How to Fight Air Pollution: The London Way". In Spiegel-Feld, Danielle (ed.). Global Sustainable Cities: City Governments and Our Environmental Future. New York: NYU Press. pp. 150–161. ISBN 978-1-4798-0574-7.
