= Hansell =

Hansell can refer to:

== People ==
- Anna Hansell, British physician
- Bill Hansell (born 1945), American politician from Oregon
- Ellen Hansell, American tennis player
- Greg Hansell, American baseball player
- Haywood S. Hansell (1903–1988), American Air Force general
- Ron Hansell (1930–2013), English footballer
- Andrew Jackson Hansell (1815–1881), American lawyer, businessman, and politician from Georgia

== Places ==
- Hansell, Iowa, a town in the United States
