= Warren Spring Laboratory =

Former UK government environmental research centre

- Established: 1958
- Laboratory type: Environmental research laboratory
- Field of research: Pollution, waste management, alternative fuel
- Director: S.H. Clarke; Charles C. Hall; Alan Robinson
- Alumni: Martin Williams
- Location: Stevenage, England; 51.88503°N 0.20037°W
- Operating agency: Department of Trade and Industry
- Location within Hertfordshire

Warren Spring Laboratory was a UK government environmental science research centre that operated in Stevenage, Hertfordshire from 1958 until its closure in 1994. Described by New Scientist as "Britain's leading laboratory for environmental research", and by The Times as "one of Europe's most important environmental research centres", it had an international reputation in areas such as air and water pollution, waste management and recycling, land remediation, alternative fuel research, and chemical engineering. In 1994, after some political controversy, the laboratory was closed and merged with AEA Technology to form the National Environmental Technology Centre (NETCEN).

== Key research ==
Broadly, Warren Spring's mission was to monitor and reduce environmental pollution and land contamination, to optimize the use of materials, and to recover useful materials, such as precious metals, from waste. It was organized in separate divisions, which changed over the years. In the early 1960s, the divisions were Atmospheric Pollution; Chemical Engineering and Process Development; Engineering Services and Human Sciences; Extraction of Metals; Mineral Processing; and Physical and Chemical Services. In the early 1990s, the six divisions were: Air Pollution; Pollution Abatement; Materials Recovery; Biological Treatment; Marine Pollution and Bulk Materials; and Chemical Analysis.

The air pollution division was headed by Sean Craxford and, later, Martin Williams. Initially, its work included tackling the problem of smog, which had contributed to around 12,000 deaths during the 1952 Great Smog of London.

According to a 1958 article in Nature, the Department of Scientific and Industrial Research (DSIR) wanted Warren Spring "to be a versatile station, free to do work on any subject which becomes important for the nation and which cannot be fitted into the programme of another research body". For example, in 1960, Warren Spring Laboratory was tasked with "deciding the best ways to deal with oil pollution of the foreshores of coastal resorts" (a mission later extended to include "the treatment and disposal of floating oil at sea").

== History ==
The laboratory was originally conceived as a replacement for the DSIR Fuel Research Station in Greenwich. However, it was deliberately given a much less specific name, based on the area in Stevenage where it was built, to reflect a wider brief than simply researching fuel.

Warren Spring was planned by the Fuel Research Station's chief development officer, David Penny, who became the project's consulting engineer. According to The Herald, "despite a rather vague and constantly changing specification, the Warren Spring laboratory at Stevenage was completed on schedule and met all the complex technical requirements". Its first director was S.H. Clarke, previously director of fire research at the Department of Scientific and Industrial Research.

The laboratory initially consisted of six main buildings (the principal, 113-meter-long three-storey laboratory, a three-story administration block built at right angles to it; and three smaller laboratories), plus assorted workshops and engineering stores. The main buildings were constructed from lightweight, easily movable partition walls that were designed to be "as flexible as possible in interior layout".

After transferring from DSIR to the Ministry of Technology in 1965, it was run by the Department of Trade and Industry (and its various successors) until 1994.

== Closure ==
In the early 1990s, Michael Heseltine, the UK government's President of the Board of Trade, announced that Warren Spring Laboratory would move to new premises in nearby Welwyn Garden City. Later, however, following a report from the PA Consulting Group, Heseltine scrapped the plan and announced that the laboratory would merge with the Atomic Energy Authority (AEA) and transfer to Harwell, Oxfordshire instead. This prompted considerable public opposition – and many of the Warren Spring staff simply refused to move, including most of its air pollution scientists.

There was political opposition too. In May 1993, an Early Day Motion supported by 89 mostly opposition (Labour) MPs noted "with concern reports that the President of the Board of Trade now intends to go back on the agreement reached in 1992 to relocate Warren Spring Laboratory and instead to close it with the loss of 150 jobs and scientific expertise built up over many years; and calls on the President of the Board of Trade to save Warren Spring Laboratory from closure". Later, opposition MP Michael Meacher highlighted what he saw as conflicts of interest and a lack of competitive tendering, arguing that the plan was essentially motivated by the government's wider privatisation agenda, while Chris Smith MP called the plan "merely a fattening-up exercise for privatising AEA, which was not a particularly sellable proposition on its own". In response, for the government, David Davis MP countered that the merger would "over the next five years, save the taxpayer perhaps £32 million", though the eventual saving was just £8 million.

The site of Warren Spring Laboratory, at Gunnels Wood Road, Stevenage, was sold to Glaxo, the pharmaceuticals company, for £25 million, and subsequently became a research and development laboratory.
