= Nitrogen dioxide poisoning =

- Nitrogen dioxide
- Specialty: Emergency medicine

Nitrogen dioxide poisoning is the illness resulting from the toxic effect of nitrogen dioxide (NO_{2}). It usually occurs after the inhalation of the gas beyond the threshold limit value. Nitrogen dioxide is reddish-brown with a very harsh smell at high concentrations, at lower concentrations it is colorless but may still have a harsh odour. Nitrogen dioxide poisoning depends on the duration, frequency, and intensity of exposure.

Nitrogen dioxide is an irritant of the mucous membrane linked with another air pollutant that causes pulmonary diseases such as obstructive lung disease, asthma, chronic obstructive pulmonary disease and sometimes acute exacerbation of COPD and in some cases, death. Its poor solubility in water enhances its passage and its ability to pass through the moist oral mucosa of the respiratory tract.

Like most toxic gases, the dose inhaled determines the toxicity on the respiratory tract. Occupational exposures constitute the highest risk of toxicity and domestic exposure is uncommon. Prolonged exposure to low concentration of the gas may have lethal effects, as can short-term exposure to high concentrations like chlorine gas poisoning. It is one of the major air pollutants capable of causing severe health hazards such as coronary artery disease as well as stroke. Nitrogen dioxide is often released into the environment as a byproduct of fuel combustion but rarely released by spontaneous combustion. Known sources of nitrogen dioxide gas poisoning include automobile exhaust and power stations. The toxicity may also result from non-combustible sources such as the one released from anaerobic fermentation of food grains and anaerobic digestion of biodegradable waste.

The World Health Organization (WHO) developed a global recommendation limiting exposures to less than 20 parts per billion for chronic exposure and value less 100 ppb for one hour for acute exposure, using nitrogen dioxide as a marker for other pollutants from fuel combustion. There is a significant association between indoor NO_{2} levels and increased respiratory symptoms such as wheeze, chest tightness and severity of infections among children with asthma. Historically, some cities in the United States including Chicago and Los Angeles have higher levels of nitrogen dioxide than the EPA maximum exposure limits of 100 ppb for a one-hour exposure and less than 53 ppb for chronic exposure.

== Signs and symptoms ==
Nitrogen dioxide poisoning is harmful to all forms of life just like chlorine gas poisoning and carbon monoxide poisoning. It is easily absorbed through the lungs and its inhalation can result in heart failure and sometimes death in severe cases. Individuals and ethnicities may differ in nitrogen dioxide tolerance level and individual tolerance level for the gas may be altered by several factors, such as metabolic rate, barometric pressure, and hematological disorders but significant exposure may result in fatal conditions that could lead to shorter lifespan due to heart failure.

=== Acute poisoning ===
Exposure to high level of nitrogen dioxide may lead to inflammation of the mucous membrane and the lower and upper respiratory tracts. The symptoms of acute nitrogen dioxide poisoning is non-specific and have a semblance with ammonia gas poisoning, chlorine gas poisoning, and carbon monoxide poisoning. The symptoms also resembles that of pneumonia or viral infection and other inhalational injuries but common symptoms includes rhinitis wheezing or coughing, conjunctivitis, headache, throat irritation and dyspnea which may progress to nasal fissures, ulcerations, or perforation. The patient is usually ill-appearing and presents with hypoxemia coupled with shallow rapid breathing. Therapy is supportive and includes removal from further nitrogen dioxide exposure. Systemic symptoms include fever and anorexia. Electrocardiography and chest radiography can help in revealing diffuse, bilateral alveolar infiltrates.

Chest radiography may be used in diagnosis and the baseline could be established with pulmonary function testing. There is no specific laboratory diagnostic test for acute nitrogen dioxide poisoning but analysis of arterial blood gas level, methemoglobin level, complete blood count, glucose test, lactate threshold measurement and r peripheral blood smear may be helpful in the diagnosis of nitrogen dioxide poisoning. The determination of nitrogen dioxide in urine or tissue does not establish the diagnosis, and there are technical and interpretive problems with these tests.

=== Chronic poisoning ===
Prolonged exposure to high levels of nitrogen dioxide can have an inflammatory effect that principally targets the respiratory tracts leading to chronic nitrogen dioxide poisoning which can occur within days or weeks after the threshold limit value is excessively exceeded.

This condition causes fever, rapid breathing coupled with rapid heart rate, labored breathing and severe shortness of breath. Other effects include diaphoresis, chest pain, and persistent dry cough, all of which may result in weight loss, anorexia and may also lead to right-side heart enlargement and heart disease in advanced cases. Prolonged exposure to relatively low levels of nitrogen (II) oxide may cause persistent headaches and nausea. Like chlorine gas poisoning, symptoms usually resolve themselves upon removal from further nitrogen dioxide exposure, unless there had been an episode of severe acute poisoning. Treatment and management vary with symptoms. Patients are often observed for hypoxemia for a minimum of 12 hours if there are no initial symptoms and if the patient is hypoxemic, oxygen may be administered but high-dose steroids are recommended for patients with pulmonary manifestations. Patients may also be hospitalized for 12 to 24 hours or longer for observation if the gaseous exchange is impaired. In a case where gaseous exchange is impaired, mechanical ventilation and intubation may be necessary and if bronchiolitis obliterans develop within 2 to 6 weeks of nitrogen dioxide exposure, corticosteroid therapy or anticholinergic medications may be required for 6 to 12 months to lower the body overreaction to nitrogen dioxide gas.

== Cause ==
Occupational exposures constitute the highest risk of toxicity and it is often high for farmers especially those that deal with food grains. It is equally high for firefighters and military personnel, especially those officers that deal in explosives. The risk is also high for arc welders, traffic officers, aerospace staffs and miners as well as those people whose occupations are connected with the nitric acid. Silo-filler's disease is a consequence of exposure to nitrogen dioxide poisoning by farmers dealing with silos. Food grains such as corn and millet, as well as grasses such as alfalfa and some other plant material, produces nitrogen dioxide within hours due to anaerobic fermentation. The threshold concentrations of nitrogen dioxide are often attained within 1 to 2 days and begin to decline gradually after 10 to 14 days but if the silos is well sealed, the gas may remain in there for weeks. Heavily fertilized silage, particularly the ones produced from immature plants, generate a higher concentration of the gas within the silo. Nitrogen dioxide is about 1.5 times heavier than air and during silage storage, nitrogen dioxide remains in the silage material. Improper ventilation may result in exposure during the leveling of the silage.

== Pathophysiology ==
Nitrogen dioxide is sparingly soluble in water and on inhalation, it diffuses into the lung and slowly hydrolyzes to nitrous and nitric acid which causes pulmonary edema and pneumonitis leading to the inflammation of the bronchioles and pulmonary alveolus resulting from lipid peroxidation and oxidative stress. Mucous membrane is primarily affected along with type I pneumocyte and the respiratory epithelium. The generation of free radicals from lipid peroxidation results in irritation of the bronchioles and alveoli that causes rapid destruction of the respiratory epithelial cells. The overall reaction results in the release of fluid that causes pulmonary edema.

Nitrogen dioxide poisoning may alter macrophage activity and immune function leading to susceptibility of the body to a wide range of infections, and overexposure to the gas may also lead to methemoglobinemia, a disorder characterized by a higher than normal level of methemoglobin (metHb, i.e., ferric [Fe^{3+}] rather than ferrous [Fe^{2+}] haemoglobin) in the blood.

Methemoglobinemia prevents the binding of oxygen to haemoglobin causing oxygen depletion that could lead to severe hypoxia.

If nitrogen dioxide poisoning is untreated, fibrous granulation tissue is likely to develop within the alveolar ducts, tiny ducts that connect the respiratory bronchioles to alveolar sacs, each of which contains a collection of alveoli (small mucus-lined pouches made of flattened epithelial cells). The overall reaction may cause an obstructive lung disease. Meanwhile, proliferative bronchiolitis is a secondary effect of nitrogen dioxide poisoning.

== Epidemiology ==
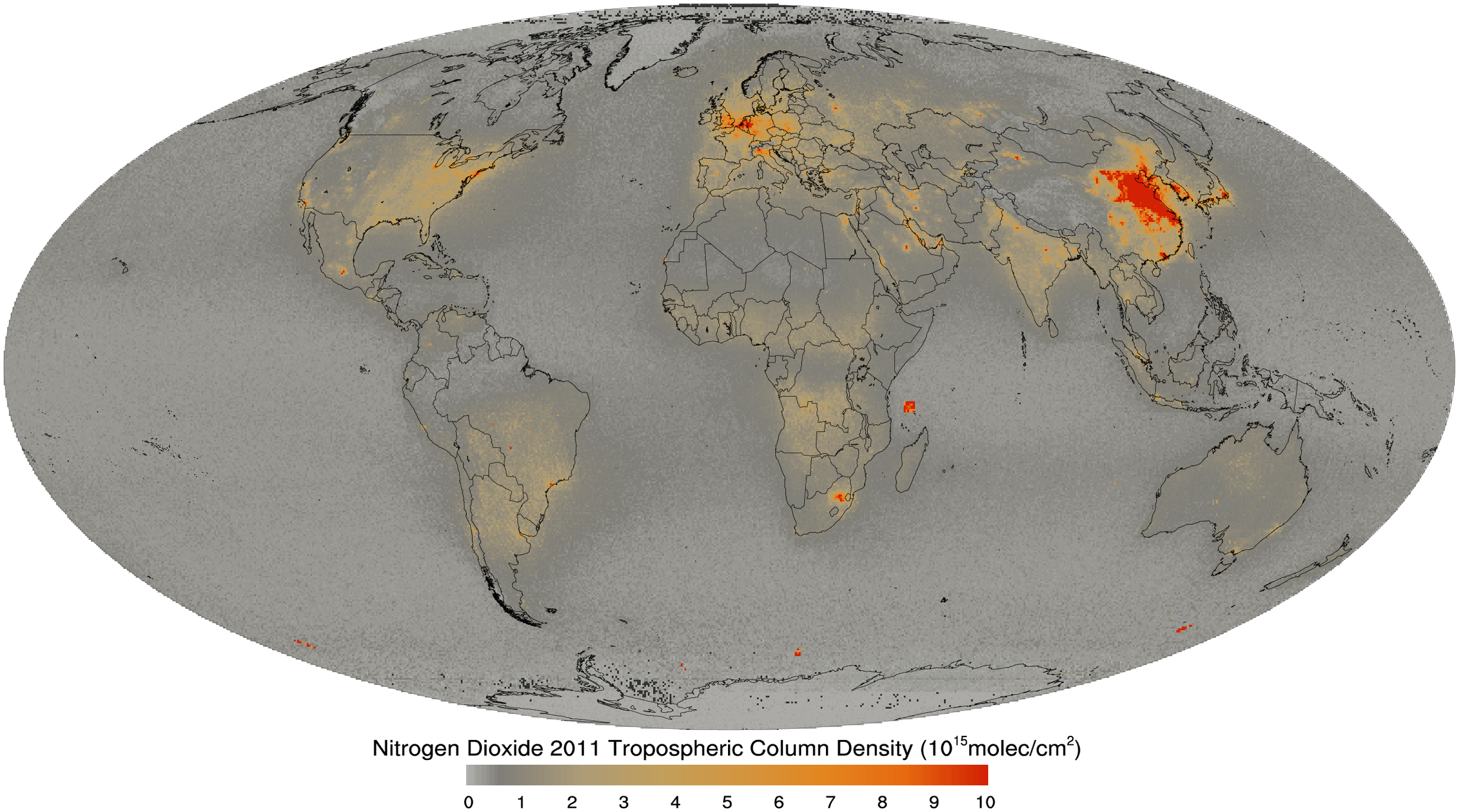
Nitrogen dioxide 2011 tropospheric column density.

The EPA have some regulations and guidelines for monitoring nitrogen dioxide levels. Historically, some states in the US including Chicago, Northeast corridor and Los Angeles have had high levels of nitrogen dioxide.

In 2006, the WHO estimated that over 2 million deaths result annually from air pollution in which nitrogen dioxide constitute one of the pollutants. While over 50% of the disease that results from these pollutants are common in developing countries and the effects in developed countries is also significant. An EPA survey in the US suggests that 16 percent of United States' housing units are sited close to an airport, highway or railroad increasing in the United States the exposure risk of approximately 48 million people.

A feasibility study of the ozone formed from the oxidation of nitrogen dioxide in ambient air reported by the WHO suggested that daily deaths of 1 to 2% is attributed to exposure to ozone concentration above 47.3 ppb and exposure above 75.7 ppb is attributed to 3 to 5% increase in daily mortality. A level of 114 ppb was attributed to 5 to 9% increase daily mortality.

Silo filler's disease is pervasive during the harvest seasons of food grains.

In May 2015, the National Green Tribunal directed Delhi and other states in India to ban diesel vehicles over 10 years old as a measure to reduce nitrogen dioxide emission that may result in nitrogen dioxide poisoning. In 2008, the report of United Kingdom Committee on the Medical Effects of Air Pollutants (COMEAP) suggested that air pollution is the cause of about 29,000 deaths in UK. The WHO urban air quality database estimated Delhi's mean annual PM 10 levels in 2010 as 286 μg /m^{3} and London as 23 μg /m^{3}. In 2014, the database estimated Delhi's annual mean PM 2.5 particulate matter levels in 2013 as 156 μg /m^{3} whereas, London have only 8 μg /m^{3} in 2010 but the nitrogen dioxide in London breach the European Union's standard. In 2013, the annual mean nitrogen dioxide level in London was estimated as 58 μg /m^{3} but the save and "threshold limit value" is 40 μg /m^{3}. In March 2015, Brussels took the United Kingdom into court for breaching emissions limits of nitrogen dioxide at its coal-fired Aberthaw power stations in Wales. The plant operated under a permit allowing emissions of 1200 mg/Nm^{3}, which is more than twice the 5 mg/Nm^{3} limit specified in the EU's large combustion plant directive.

== Prognosis ==
Generally, long-term prognosis is helpful to survival of initial exposure to nitrogen dioxide. Some cases of nitrogen dioxide poisoning resolves with no observable symptoms and patient may be determined by pulmonary function testing. If chronic exposure causes lung damage, it could take several days or months for the pulmonary function to improve. Meanwhile, permanent mild dysfunction may result from bronchiolitis obliterans and could manifest as abnormal flow at 50 to 70 percent of vital capacity. It may also manifest as mild hyperinflammation, airway obstruction and in that case, patient may be subject to steroid treatment to treat deconditioning. Complications from prolong exposure includes bronchiolitis obliterans and other secondary infections such as pneumonia due to injuries on the mucous membrane from pulmonary edema and inhibition of immune system by nitrogen dioxide. Nitrogen dioxide inhalation can result in short and long-term morbidity or death depending on the extent of exposure and inhaled concentration and the exposure time. Illness resulting from acute exposure is usually not fatal although some exposure may cause bronchiolitis obliterans, pulmonary edema as well as rapid asphyxiation. If the concentration of exposure is excessively high, the gas may displace oxygen resulting in fatal asphyxiation.

Generally, patients and workers should be educated by medical personnel on how to identify the signs and symptoms of Nitrogen dioxide poisoning. Farmers and other farm workers should be educated on the proper way of food grain storage to prevent silo filler's disease.

== Biochemical effects ==
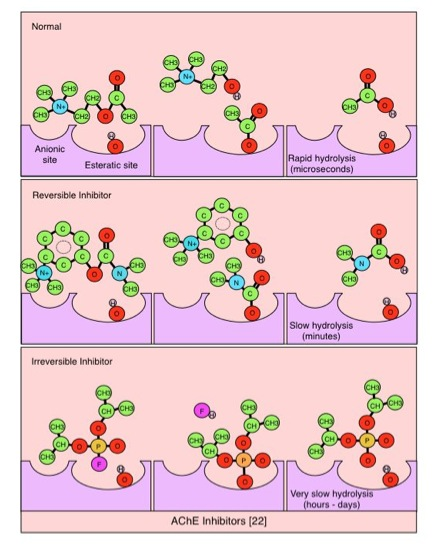
Mechanism of Inhibitors of AChE

Chronic exposure to high level of nitrogen dioxide results in the allosteric inhibition of glutathione peroxidase and glutathione S-transferase, both of which are important enzymes found in the mucous membrane antioxidant defense system, that catalyse nucleophilic attack by reduced glutathione (GSH) on non-polar compounds that contain an electrophilic carbon and nitrogen. These inhibition mechanisms generates free radicals that causes peroxidation from the lipids in the mucous membrane leading to increased peroxidized erythrocyte lipids, a reaction that proceeds by a free radical chain reaction mechanism that result in oxidative stress. The oxidative stress on the mucous membrane causes the dissociation of the GSTp-JNK complex, oligomerization of GSTP and induction of the JNK pathway, resulting in apoptosis or inflammation of the bronchioles and pulmonary alveolus in mild cases. On migrating to the bloodstream, nitrogen dioxide poisoning results in an irreversible inhibition of the erythrocyte membrane acetylcholinesterase which may lead to muscular paralysis, convulsions, bronchoconstriction, the narrowing of the airways in the lungs (bronchi and bronchioles) and death by asphyxiation. It also causes a decrease in glucose-6-phosphate dehydrogenase which may results in glucose-6-phosphate dehydrogenase deficiency known as favism, a condition that predisposes to hemolysis (spontaneous destruction of red blood cells). Acute and chronic exposure also reduces glutathione reductase, an enzyme that catalyzes the reduction of glutathione disulfide (GSSG) to the sulfhydryl form glutathione (GSH), which is a critical molecule in resisting oxidative stress and maintaining the reducing environment of the cell.

== Reproductive effects ==
Exposure to nitrogen dioxide has a significant effect on the male reproductive system by inhibiting the production of Sertoli cells, the "nurse" cells of the testicles that are part of a seminiferous tubule and help in the process of spermatogenesis. These effects consequently retard the production of sperm cells. The effects of nitrogen dioxide poisoning on female reproduction may be linked with the effects of oxidative stress on female reproduction. Nitrogen dioxide poisoning disrupts the balance of reactive oxygen species (ROS), which results in oxidative stress, leading to significant effects on the female reproductive lifespan. ROS play a significant role in body physiology, from oocyte production, development and maturation to fertilization, development of the embryo and gestation. Exposure to nitrogen dioxide causes ovulation-induced oxidative damage to the DNA of ovarian epithelium. There is a growing body of literature on the pathological effects of ROS on female reproduction as evidenced by free-radical-induced birth defects, abortions, hydatidiform moles and pre-eclampsia. ROS also play a significant role in the etiopathogenesis of endometriosis, a disease in which tissue that normally grows inside the uterus grows outside of it. Oxidative stress causes defective placentation, which is likely to lead to placental hypoxia, shortage of oxygen in the placental as well as reperfusion injury resulting from ischemia, which may lead to endothelial cell dysfunction. Increased oxidative stress caused by nitrogen dioxide poisoning may result in ovarian epithelium inflammation and potentially to cancer in the most severe cases.
