= Department of Scientific and Industrial Research (United Kingdom) =

Department of the British Government

Agency overview
- Formed: 1916
- Dissolved: 1 April 1965
- Superseding agencies: Department of Education and Science; Ministry of Technology
- Jurisdiction: British Government
- Minister responsible: Lord President of the Council (1916-1959); Minister for Science (1959-1964); Secretary of State for Education and Science (1964-1965)

The Department of Scientific and Industrial Research (DSIR) was a department of the British Government responsible for the organisation, development, and encouragement of scientific and industrial research between 1916 and 1965.

Between 1916 and 1959 DSIR was headed by the Lord President of the Privy Council. This changed in 1959 with the creation of the position of Minister for Science. In 1964 this position was merged with the Minister of Education to create the position of Secretary of State for Education and Science. In 1964 both the Department of Education and Science and the Ministry of Technology were established and DSIR was formally abolished in 1965.

== Foundation ==
Before the twentieth century, the government was little concerned with scientific enquiry. By 1914 there were a number of small governmental bodies with a specialised scientific interest, but little organised effort towards the application of discoveries made in fundamental research and no organisation concerned with the application of science to industry. The impetus to the establishment of the department was provided by the needs of the war effort. At the outbreak of the First World War "Britain found... it was dangerously dependent on enemy industries". At the request of the Board of Trade, the Board of Education prepared a White Paper under the chairmanship of Sir William McCormick. The DSIR was set up to fill the roles that the White Paper specified: "to finance worthy research proposals, to award research fellowships and studentships [in universities], and to encourage the development of research associations in private industry and research facilities in university science departments. [It] rapidly assumed a key role in coordinating government aid to university research. The initiative was taken by Arthur Henderson, the President of the Board of Education who, in May 1915, presented to Parliament a white paper urging that a permanent organisation for the promotion of scientific and industrial research should be set up.

By order in council of 28 July 1915 authority for such an organisation was vested in a committee of the Privy Council consisting at first of six ministers and three other privy councillors in their personal capacities. This new Committee for Scientific and Industrial Research was to be assisted by an Advisory Council, which in turn was assisted by certain advisory committees. As a first step, a scheme was devised for encouraging groups of firms to set up co-operative industrial research associations. For this purpose, a lump sum of £1 million, the 'Million Fund', was voted and an Imperial Trust was set up to administer it. Because of the close connection between education and research, the President of the Board of Education was nominated as vice-president of the committee of the Privy Council, and the committee's staff and accommodation were at first provided by the board. Once the full four-tier organisation of the committee of the council, the Advisory Council, the Imperial Trust and the department was established. In 1928 the committee of council was reconstituted with an entirely ministerial membership; otherwise, the organisation survived with only small changes until the 1950s.

With the increasing importance of the industrial side of research, these initial arrangements soon became inadequate. Consequently, in December 1916 a separate Department of Scientific and Industrial Research was created, having its own parliamentary vote but responsible to Parliament through the Lord President of the Council. The department was responsible for the organisation, development and encouragement of scientific and industrial research and the dissemination of its results. It worked by encouraging and supporting scientific research in universities, technical colleges and other institutions, establishing and developing its own research organisations for investigation and research relative to the advancement of trade and industry, and taking steps to further the practical application of the results of research. It could make grants for the purposes of any of these functions.

The department was not responsible for research undertaken primarily to meet the requirements of national defence, nor did it cover all government activity in research for civil purposes. Large areas of research were the responsibility of other bodies – aviation, atomic energy, agriculture, health and medicine, meteorology – though it might undertake specific investigations on behalf of the responsible departments. The department encouraged and supported scientific research in universities and other institutions by means of grants for special research projects, research fellowships, studentships, grants to research associations and research contracts.

== Development ==
The department absorbed or created a number of research organisations, which included large laboratories for special fields of work. Existing institutions for which it assumed responsibility were the National Physical Laboratory from the Royal Society in 1918, the Geological Survey and Geological Museum from the Board of Education in 1919, the Road Experimental Station from the Ministry of Transport in 1933, the Laboratory of the Government Chemist (previously the Government Chemist's Department) in 1959, and the Tropical Products Institute from the Colonial Office in the same year.

Some research organisations founded by the department had functions defined in terms of a field of science or technology such as the Chemical Research Laboratory, the National Engineering Laboratory and the Hydraulics Research Station. Others were defined in terms of a practical objective, such as the Building Research Station, the Fire Research Station, the Forest Products Research Laboratory, the Fuel Research Station, the Radio Research Station, the Torry Research Station and the Water Pollution Research Laboratory. The British Museum Laboratory, established by the department in 1919, was transferred to the museum in 1930.

Three food research establishments, the Pest Infestation Laboratory, Low Temperature Research Station and Ditton Laboratory, passed to the Agricultural Research Council in 1959. From 1941 to 1945 the department was responsible for atomic energy research, in an organisation known as the Directorate of Tube Alloys. In the 1950s the department embarked on research in the human sciences in relation to the needs of industry, undertaken from 1953 to 1957 in collaboration with the Medical Research Council; in 1958 the department's research programme was transferred from its Headquarters Office to the new Warren Spring Laboratory.

The executive head of each research organisation was a director of research responsible to the head of the department. The director was provided with one or more research institutes or laboratories and with an advisory research board. The research boards were appointed by the lord president of the council until 1956 and thereafter by the Council for Scientific and Industrial Research. The boards were responsible for advising the council on the programme of work to be undertaken, and to watch, comment and advise, and to report annually, on the progress of the approved programme.

A Scottish branch office of the department was opened in Edinburgh in September 1947, a Welsh office at Cardiff in 1953, and a Northern branch office at Newcastle upon Tyne in 1963. Late in 1954, the Lord President appointed a small committee under the chairmanship of Sir Henry Jephcott to enquire into the organisation and functioning of the department. Its recommendations were given effect in the Department of Scientific and Industrial Research Act 1956, which abolished the advisory council and the Imperial Trust and vested executive power in a new Council for Scientific and Industrial Research.

The council, set up on 7 November 1956, was appointed by and responsible to the Lord President of the council and was required to comply with any directions it might receive from a committee of the Privy Council for scientific and industrial research. In 1959 these functions of the lord president were transferred to the newly created Minister for Science.

In April 1964 the Ministry of Education and the office of the Minister for Science were merged to create the Department of Education and Science. The new Secretary of State for Education and Science took over other residual research functions of the Lord President together with his general responsibility for the University Grants Committee. While in October 1964 the Ministry of Technology was established by the incoming government of Harold Wilson as part of Wilson's ambition to modernise the state. Following these changes the department was formally dissolved by the Science and Technology Act 1965, with effect from 1 April 1965. The Department of Education and Science, took over responsibility for overseas scientific liaison and the general advancement of scientific knowledge, while the Ministry of Technology became responsible for the application of scientific knowledge to industry and for the majority of the department's research establishments. The Act also created and the new Science Research Council, which was now to deal with grants for university research and awards for postgraduate students and the Natural Environment Research Council, both these Councils were overseen by the Secretary of State for Education and Science.

== Research laboratories ==
Administered by the DSIR prior to its disbandment in 1965:

- Building Research Station, Watford (from 1921) later renamed Building Research Establishment, and now simply BRE
- Fuel Research Station, Greenwich, moved 1959 to Stevenage and renamed Warren Spring Laboratory (WSL)
- National Physical Laboratory, Teddington (from circa 1917)
- Radio Research Station, Ditton Park (from 1924)
- Road Research Laboratory, Harmondsworth (from 1933), moved to Crowthorne, as of 2016 named Transport Research Laboratory
- National Engineering Laboratory, East Kilbride (later transferred to the DTI)

== Chairmen of the Advisory Council ==
- Sir William McCormick (1915-1930)
- Sir Vernon H. Blackman (1930)
- Lord Rutherford (1930-1937)
- Lord Cadman (1937)
- Lord Riverdale (1937-1946)
- Sir Geoffrey Heyworth (1946-1949)
- Sir Ian Heilbron (1949-1954)
- Sir Hugh Beaver (1954-1956)
- Sir Harry Jephcott (1956-1965)

== Secretaries of the Department ==
- Sir Frank Heath (1916-1927)
- Sir Henry T. Tizard (1927-1929)
- Sir Frank E. Smith (1929-1939)
- Sir Edward V. Appleton (1939-1949)
- Sir Ben Lockspeiser (1949-1956)
- Sir Harry W. Melville (1956-1965)

== External sources ==
Industrial Research And Development In The United Kingdom A Survey.
