= William McCormick (academic) =

Scottish education administrator (1859–1930)

Professor Sir William McCormick GBE FRS FRSE
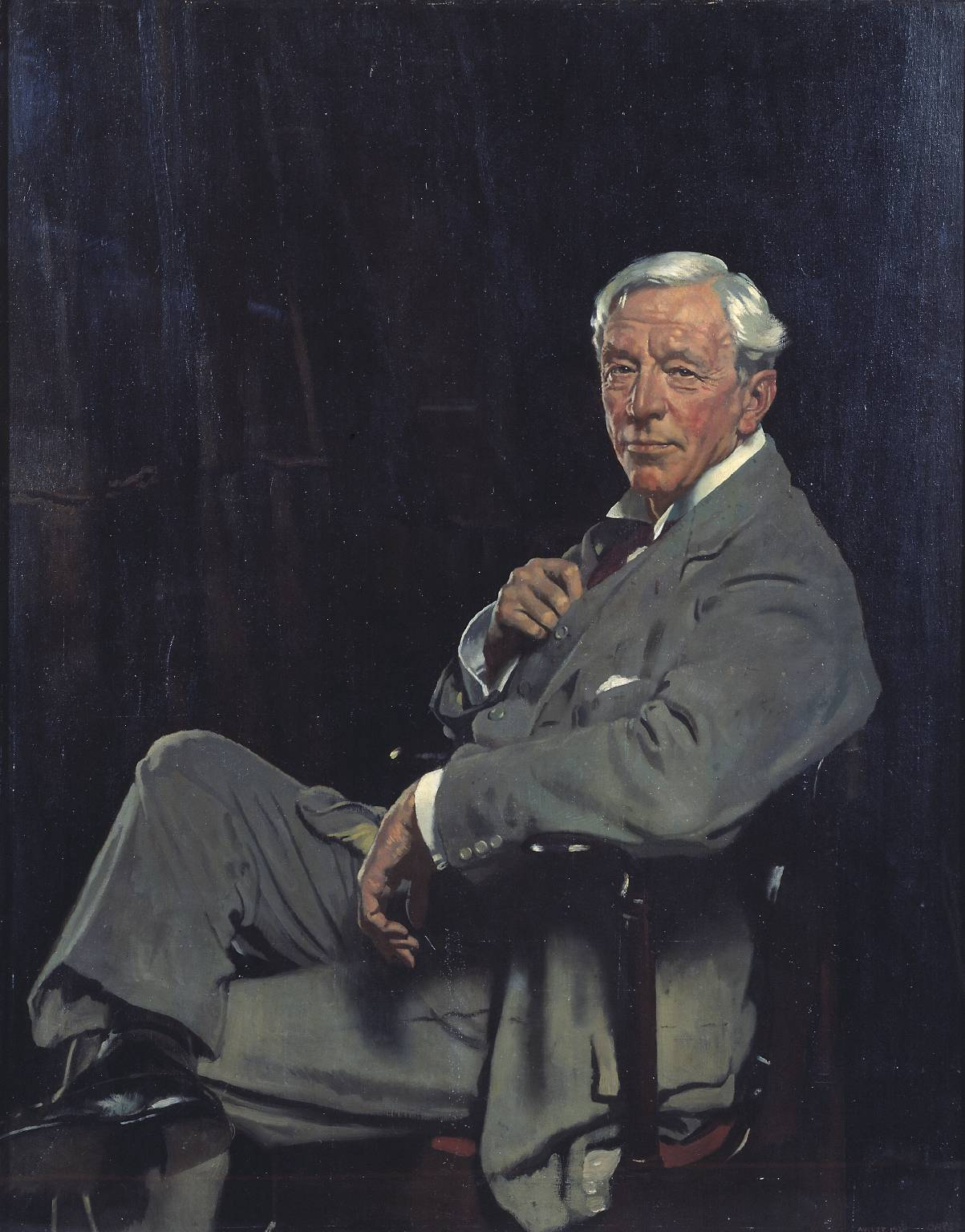
- Born: 29 April 1859; Dumfries, Scotland
- Died: 22 March 1930 (aged 70); At sea
- Education: University of Glasgow
- Occupations: Scholar and educational administrator
- Spouse: Mabel Emily Cook (m. 1897–1930)

Sir William Symington McCormick (29 April 1859 – 22 March 1930) was a Scottish scholar and educational administrator. He was the first secretary of the Carnegie Trust and was a professor at University College, Dundee.

== Life and career ==
McCormick was born on 29 April 1859 on Dunbar Terrace in Dumfries, Scotland, the eldest son of William McCormick, an ironmonger, and his wife, Agnes Ann Symington. He was educated locally at Dumfries High School.

After graduating MA from the University of Glasgow in 1880, he worked for a short time as assistant lecturer in mathematics to Hugh Blackburn before attending the University of Göttingen and the University of Marburg to study literature. On his return to Scotland, he worked as assistant lecturer in English literature to John Nichol from 1884. In 1890, McCormick was appointed as Professor of English Language and Literature by the then University College, Dundee, alongside a lectureship at the University of St Andrews. When the women only Queen Margaret College amalgamated with the University of Glasgow in 1892–93, McCormick became the head of department and lecturer on English language and literature there.

McCormick career turned towards academic administration starting in 1900 when he was asked by the General Medical Council to prepare a report on preliminary examination for medical students. The following year, he was appointed as the first secretary of the Carnegie Trust.

In 1903 he was elected a Fellow of the Royal Society of Edinburgh. His proposers were Sir John Murray, Sir Robert Pullar, Robert Flint and Alexander Buchanan.

From 1906 until his death, McCormick held a number of government committee positions related to state university funding. Alongside his many other positions, he served as chairman of the Advisory Council for Scientific and Industrial Research from 1915.

McCormick received an honorary doctorate (LL.D.) from the University of St Andrews in February 1902. In 1928, he was elected to the Fellowship of the Royal Society under its Statute 12 regulation for "conspicuous service to the cause of science, [and] such that his election would be of signal benefit to the Society". Having already been made a Knight Bachelor in 1911, McCormick was made a Knight Grand Cross of the Order of the British Empire in 1929.

== Personal life ==
In 1897 McCormick married Mabel Emily Cook, daughter of Sir Frederick Cook, 2nd Baronet in 1897. Together, they had one son and two daughters. They lived at Frognal Priory in Hampstead, London.

McCormick died at sea on 22 March 1930.

== Publications ==
- Three Lectures on English Literature, 1889.
- "Thomas Hoccleve" in Encyclopædia Britannica, (11th ed.), 1911.
