= Deborah Jarvis =

British public health professor

Deborah (Debbie) Jarvis
- Born: UK
- Citizenship: British
- Known for: Epidemiology of Asthma; Epidemiology of Allergy
- Scientific career
- Fields: Public health
- Workplaces: National Heart & Lung Institute; Imperial College London
- Website: https://www.imperial.ac.uk/people/d.jarvis

Deborah (Debbie) Jarvis is a British emeritus professor of public health at the National Heart and Lung Institute, Imperial College London. She is an authority on the epidemiology of asthma in adults.

== Education and career ==
Jarvis obtained both her MB.BS degree and MD (postgraduate research degree) from University of London, and trained in public health in South East Thames. The early part of her research career was spent at King's College London. She moved to Imperial College London in 2006.

Jarvis's main research focus has been on identifying lifestyle and environmental factors, including air pollution, that could determine whether adults have or develop allergy, asthma or chronic obstructive pulmonary disease. She is project lead of the European Community Respiratory Health Survey (ECRHS) and principal investigator of the Ageing Lungs in European Cohorts study. She was member of the Committee on the Medical Effects of Air Pollutants (COMEAP), and served as Chair of the Epidemiology group of the Occupation and Epidemiology Assembly of the European Respiratory Society.

== Significant publications ==
- Amaral AF, Strachan DP, Burney PG, Jarvis DL (2017). "Female smokers are at greater risk of airflow obstruction than male smokers: UK Biobank". American Journal of Respiratory and Critical Care Medicine. 195: 1226-1235.
- Amaral AFS, Newson RB, Abramson MJ, Anto JM, Bono R, Corsico AG, de Marco R, Demoly P, Forsberg B, Gislason T, Heinrich J, Huerta I, Janson C, Jogi R, Kim JL, Maldonado J, Martinez-Moratalla Rovira J, Neukirch C, Nowak D, Pin I, Probst-Hensch N, Raherison-Semjen C, Svanes C, Urrutia Landa I, van Ree R, Versteeg SA, Weyler J, Zock JP, Burney PGJ, Jarvis DL (2015). "Changes in IgE sensitization and total IgE levels over 20 years of follow-up". Journal of Allergy and Clinical Immunology. 137: 1788-1795.e9.
- Canova C, Heinrich J, Maria Anto J, Leynaert B, Smith M, Kuenzli N, Zock J-P, Janson C, Cerveri I, de Marco R, Toren K, Gislason T, Nowak D, Pin I, Wjst M, Manfreda J, Svanes C, Crane J, Abramson M, Burr M, Burney P, Jarvis D (2013). "The influence of sensitisation to pollens and moulds on seasonal variations in asthma attacks" European Respiratory Journal. 42: 935-945.
- Ghosh RE, Cullinan P, Fishwick D, Hoyle J, Warburton CJ, Strachan DP, Butland BK, Jarvis D (2013). "Asthma and occupation in the 1958 birth cohort" Thorax. 68: 365-371.
- Ramasamy A, Curjuric I, Coin LJ, Kumar A, McArdle WL, Imboden M, Leynaert B, Kogevinas M, Schmid-Grendelmeier P, Pekkanen J, Wjst M, Bircher AJ, Sovio U, Rochat T, Hartikainen A-L, Balding DJ, Jarvelin M-R, Probst-Hensch N, Strachan DP, Jarvis DL (2011). "A genome-wide meta-analysis of genetic variants associated with allergic rhinitis and grass sensitization and their interaction with birth order". Journal of Allergy and Clinical Immunology. 128: 996-1005.
- Jarvis, D; Chinn, S; Luczynska, C; Burney, P (1996). "Association of respiratory symptoms and lung function in young adults with use of domestic gas appliances". Lancet. 347: 426–431.
