= David Fowler (physicist) =

British environmental physicist

David Fowler CBE FRS FRSE
- Born: 1 June 1950 (age 76)
- Known for: Air pollution

Academic background
- Education: University of Nottingham

Academic work
- Discipline: Environmental physics
- Institutions: Centre for Ecology & Hydrology
- Website: Official website

David Fowler (born 1 June 1950) is a British environmental physicist, recognized as an authority on atmospheric pollution. He specializes in micrometeorology, the land-atmosphere exchange of trace gases and particles, and the effects of pollutants on vegetation.

== Education and career ==
Fowler gained a B.Sc. in environmental physics at the University of Nottingham in 1972, followed by a Ph.D. at the same university in 1976, before moving to the Institute of Terrestrial Ecology in Edinburgh (later incorporated into the Centre for Ecology & Hydrology), where he spent the next four decades of his career. He has authored around 250 peer-reviewed papers.

== Policy work ==
Apart from scientific research, Fowler has also worked on the application of air quality science to public policy in both the UK and Europe. He has been a member of around two dozen scientific committees, including the Royal Society Global Environmental Research Committee (of which he has been chair since 2011), and the Air Quality Expert Group, of which he is an ad-hoc member.

In 2008, Fowler chaired a committee of European air pollution experts to produce a major study of ground-level ozone for the Royal Society, which concluded "that existing emission controls will not be sufficient to reduce ozone concentrations to levels acceptable for human health and environmental protection" and called "for renewed global action to address ozone and its precursors".

== Awards ==
Fowler became an honorary professor of the University of Nottingham in 1991, was elected a Fellow of the Royal Society of Edinburgh in 1999, and a Fellow of the Royal Society of London in 2002. He was awarded the CBE in 2005 for services to atmospheric sciences.

== Selected publications ==
- Fowler, David, ed. (2008). Ground-level ozone in the 21st century: future trends, impacts and policy implications (PDF). London: The Royal Society. ISBN 978-0-85403-713-1. Archived (PDF) from the original on 1 June 2023.
- Shindekk, D; Kuylenstierna, J; Vignati, E; van Dingenen, R; Annen, M; et al. (13 January 2012). "Simultaneously Mitigating Near-Term Climate Change and Improving Human Health and Food Security". Science. 335 (6065): 183–189. Bibcode:2012Sci...335..183S. doi:10.1126/science.1210026. PMID 22246768. S2CID 14113328.
- Fowler, David; Coyle, Mhairi; Skiba, Ute; Cape, J. Neil; Sheppard, Lucy; et al. (5 July 2013). "The global nitrogen cycle in the twenty-first century". Phil. Trans. R. Soc. B. 368 (1621). doi:10.1098/rstb.2013.0164. PMC 3682748. PMID 23713126.
- Monks, P. S.; Archibald, A. T.; Colette, A.; Cooper, O.; Coyle, M.; et al. (13 August 2015). "Tropospheric ozone and its precursors from the urban to the global scale from air quality to short-lived climate forcer". Atmospheric Chemistry and Physics. 15 (15): 8889–8973. Bibcode:2015ACP....15.8889M. doi:10.5194/acp-15-8889-2015. eISSN 1680-7324. hdl:20.500.11820/cc8e7611-fa81-42e4-b209-9a497864ea68. Archived from the original on 29 April 2022.
- Fowler, David; Pyle, John; Sutton, Mark; Williams, Martin (2020). "Global Air Quality, past present and future: an introduction". Phil. Trans. R. Soc. A. 378 (2183). Bibcode:2020RSPTA.37890323F. doi:10.1098/rsta.2019.0323. PMC 7536034. PMID 32981444.
- Fowler, David; Brimblecombe, Peter; Burrows, John; Heal, Mathew; Grennfelt, Peringe; et al. (30 October 2020). "A chronology of global air quality". Phil. Trans. R. Soc. A. 378 (2183). Bibcode:2020RSPTA.37890314F. doi:10.1098/rsta.2019.0314. PMC 7536029. PMID 32981430.
