= Air Quality Expert Group =

Air Quality Expert Group (AQEG) is an official committee of scientific advisers who provide independent advice on air pollutants to the UK government's Department for Environment, Food and Rural Affairs (Defra). The group is drawn mostly from academia and consists of about a dozen atmospheric chemists and other environmental scientists. AQEG also advises government officials and ministers on air quality issues, suggests priority areas for future work, and advises on changes in international policy. AQEG was created in 2001, consolidating the work of a number of previous advisory groups including the Quality of Urban Air Review Group, Airborne Particles Expert Group, and Expert Panel on Air Quality Standards.

AQEG's recent work has included reports on ozone trends, exhaust emissions from road transport, air pollution changes during the COVID-19 pandemic, agricultural air pollution, and impacts of shipping on air quality.

== Membership ==
Alastair Lewis of the National Centre for Atmospheric Science and University of York has chaired the committee since 2019; from 2009 to 2019, it was chaired by Paul Monks of the University of Leicester; from 2001 to 2009 it was chaired by Mike Pilling of the University of Leeds. Other notable members have included Roy Harrison, Helen ApSimon, Martin Williams, and David Fowler.

== Recent work ==
AQEG investigates and publishes reports on all aspects of air pollution, except its health impacts, which are the remit of a separate advisory group, Committee on the Medical Effects of Air Pollutants (COMEAP). Its expert members are frequently asked to comment on news stories, such as pollution from wood burners, the links between COVID-19 and air pollution, and the effectiveness of the British government's attempts to meet World Health Organization pollution guidelines, and its own reports often make headlines.

In 2011, a report by AQEG argued that biofuels "have little effect on emissions of air quality pollutants". In 2015, another of its investigations concluded that fracking increases air pollution. Two years later, it reported that the particle pollution from a single eco-friendly wood-burning stove could be six times higher than that from a heavy goods vehicle. In 2018, the group investigated natural vegetation (greater use of plants and trees) and found that it cannot offer a real solution to urban air pollution. Another 2018 report found that agricultural ammonia emissions could be reduced by about a half simply through better management of manure. In 2019, AQEG found that pollution from a vehicle's tyres can sometimes be 1000 worse than its tailpipe emissions. The same year, it reported that solvents in household and personal care products were a significant part of UK VOC emissions. Also in 2019, AQEG warned that, although electric cars produce zero tailpipe emissions, they still produce significant air pollution from their brakes, tyres, and road surface wear and that: "No legislation is currently in place to specifically limit or reduce these particles".

During the COVID-19 pandemic, AQEG actively investigated connections between the virus and air pollution, and looked into the effects of lockdowns on air pollution.

In 2022, the group drew further attention to pollution from wood-burning stoves, which, in the UK, now produce more particle pollution than road traffic.

AQEG also tests ideas for tackling pollution. In 2016, it built a computer model to test what would happen to London's air pollution if photocatalytic paints (which turn harmful chemicals into more benign ones), sometimes touted as a solution to air quality problems, were applied to every surface in the city. This concluded that nitrogen dioxide pollution would be reduced by less than 1 percent.

== See also ==
- Committee on the Medical Effects of Air Pollutants (COMEAP)
