= Committee on the Medical Effects of Air Pollutants =

Committee on the Medical Effects of Air Pollutants (COMEAP) is a group of scientific experts who provide independent and authoritative advice to the UK government on the health effects of air pollution. Its core members are typically senior academics or professionals drawn from fields such as atmospheric chemistry, environmental health, epidemiology, and toxicology; a single lay member helps to ensure the committee's technical work is accessible to the public.

== Activities ==
COMEAP's periodic reports often make headline news on issues such as how many people die from air pollution, and the connections between air pollution and disease. In 2001, COMEAP warned that long-term exposure to particulates increases risk of premature death, especially from cardiovascular disease. One of its recent reports, issued in 2022, reviewed almost 70 epidemiological studies relating to brain health and pollution and concluded that air pollution is likely to increase the risk of cognitive decline and dementia in older people.

The committee has also reported on the relative risks of breathing air pollution in different situations. In January 2019, for example, it reported that pollution from particulates is up to 30 times higher on the London Underground than on streets in the roads above, with the Northern Line having the worst air quality. Their most recent publication (2025) provides an assessment of evidence on the health effects of nano- and microplastic particles and fibres in the environment.

The committee also advises on how to best communicate air pollution risks to the public (such as through the 1–10 point warning scale used in London) and how people should change their behaviour when air pollution levels are high.

== Membership ==
COMEAP's current chair is Anna Hansell; previous chairs have included Frank Kelly, Jon Ayres, and Sir Stephen Holgate. Other members have included Roy M. Harrison, Jonathan Grigg, David Newby, H. Ross Anderson, Peter Burney, and Deborah Jarvis.

== Reports ==
COMEAP has issued numerous reports on air pollution and health, including:

- Asthma and Outdoor Air Pollution (1995)
- Non-Biological Particles and Health (1995)
- The Quantification of the Effects of Air Pollution on Health in the United Kingdom (1998)
- Guidance on the Effects on Health of Indoor Air Pollutants (2001)
- Cardiovascular Disease and Air Pollution (2006)
- Review of the UK Air Quality Index (2011)
- Quantification of Mortality and Hospital Admissions associated with Ground-level Ozone (2015)
- Long-term Exposure to Air Pollution and Chronic Bronchitis (2016)
- Nitrogen Dioxide (2018)
- Mortality effects of Long-term Exposure to Air Pollution in the UK (2018)
- Long-term Exposure to Air Pollution (2018)
- Air Pollution and Cardiovascular Disease (2018)
- Air Pollution: Cognitive Decline and Dementia (2022)
- Statement on airborne nano- and microplastic particles and fibres (2025)

=== Air Pollution: Cognitive Decline and Dementia (2022) ===
In 2022, COMEAP reviewed nearly 70 epidemiological studies (in human populations) on dementia and cognitive decline. They concluded that long-term exposure to ambient air pollution was consistently associated with declines in cognitive function, particularly those involving memory and executive function. It is known that air pollution, particularly small particle pollution, can affect the heart and the circulatory system, including circulation to the brain. These effects are linked to vascular dementia (a form of dementia), which is caused by damage to the blood vessels in the brain. Therefore, it is likely that air pollution contributes to mental decline and dementia caused by effects on the blood vessels. Air pollution might also stimulate the immune cells in the brain, which can then damage nerve cells.

COMEAP concluded that the evidence is suggestive of an association between ambient air pollutants and an acceleration of the decline in cognitive function often associated with ageing, and with the risk of developing dementia. There are several plausible biological mechanisms by which air pollutants could cause effects on the brain leading to accelerated cognitive decline and dementia. There is a strong case for the effects of air pollutants on the cardiovascular system having a secondary effect on the brain. Long-term exposure to air pollutants has been shown to damage the cardiovascular system. This may affect the blood supply to the brain and lead to damage to the brain. The association between exposure to air pollutants and effects on cognitive decline and dementia may be causally related to this mechanism.

Mechanisms also have been suggested by which air pollutants may directly affect the brain. Small particles may travel from the lung to the bloodstream and thence to the brain. Very small particles that are inhaled may enter the brain via the blood and via the olfactory nerves leading from the nasal passages to the olfactory bulbs. Some types of particulate matter are cleared from the brain only slowly, if at all, increasing their potential to produce long-term detrimental effects. A number of common pollutants may affect brain function. Animal and in vitro studies of ultrafine particulate material, diesel engine exhaust or ozone have all shown effects on the brain or brain cells. The mechanisms involved include the generation and release of free radicals within the brain and the induction of an inflammatory response; these 2 mechanisms seem likely to be linked.

COMEAP concluded that:

- The epidemiological evidence is suggestive of an association between exposure to ambient air pollutants and both the risk of developing dementia and acceleration of cognitive decline. The epidemiological literature is inconsistent as to which pollutant is most associated with these effects.
- There is evidence that air pollution, particularly particulate air pollution, increases the risk of cardiovascular, including cerebrovascular, disease. These diseases are known to have adverse effects on cognitive function. There is likely to be a causal association between particulate air pollution and effects on cognitive function in older people.
- As of 2022, direct quantification of cognitive decline or dementia associated with air pollution would be subject to unknown uncertainty.
- It may be possible to develop an indirect method of quantification of cognitive effects secondary to the effects of particulate pollution on cardiovascular disease.

== See also ==
- Air pollution in the United Kingdom
- Air Quality Expert Group (AQEG)
