= Epidemiology of asthma =

Asthma prevalence

In 2023, approximately 363 million people worldwide were affected by asthma, and 442,000 people died from the disease. Asthma tends to be more prevalent in developed than in developing countries, with asthma prevalences varying between countries from 1 to 29%. However, it is in developing countries that people tend to suffer the most severe health effects of asthma. In 2019, 96% of asthma deaths and 84% of asthma burden occurred in low-and middle-income countries.

Within developed countries asthma is more common among those who are economically disadvantaged. In developing countries, asthma may be more prevalent among wealthier individuals. This suggests that asthma involves diverse underlying mechanisms, which are not well understood. Urbanization and exposure to air pollution, unhygienic living conditions, and lack of resources for diagnosis and treatment may all contribute to frequency and severity of asthma symptoms in low-resource communities, where people are affected by complex interactions between race, place, poverty, and health access. According to the Global Initiative for Asthma (GINA), the adoption of best practices by primary care clinicians for the prevention and management of asthma could lower asthma morbidity and potentially mortality. Data from a variety of countries suggests that respiratory outcomes can be improved through the implementation of policies to reduce air pollution.

Populations of children and adults differ in incidence, risk factors, preventative measures, pathogenesis, treatment and prognosis of asthma. Patterns of asthma also differ according to gender in both children and adults. Prior to puberty, asthma is more common in boys than in girls. A possibly related factor is that boys tend to have smaller airway diameters relative to lung volume than girls. As puberty progresses, asthma symptoms increase in girls. By adulthood, both prevalence and severity of asthma are greater in populations of women compared to men. In addition to age and gender, it has been suggested that researchers distinguish between the effects of risk factors on populations of healthy individuals who may develop asthma, and on people who are already asthmatic.

== Gender ==
Globally, there are 136 million women with asthma, 57% of the 235 million people living with asthma. In addition to being more common among women, women experience more severe symptoms and are more likely to die from asthma. The severity and frequency of asthma complications differs based on both gender and age. Although asthma is more prevalent in boys than girls during childhood, women experience a significant worsening of symptoms around and after puberty. The severity and frequency of asthma symptoms in women also vary in relation to hormonal changes during the menstrual cycle, pregnancy, and menopause. The timing of the change in prevalence and severity around puberty and other hormonal life events suggest that asthma pathogenesis is related to sex hormones and sex-specific variations in immune pathways. This may interact in complex ways with socioeconomic factors such as nutrition, air quality, and access to healthcare.

Data from the Global Burden of Disease Study 2021 (GBD 2021), from 204 countries and territories, describes asthma mortality, incidence, prevalence, and disability-adjusted life years (DALYs) from 1990 to 2021. The highest incidence of asthma was for children under 5 years old, while the highest mortality and DALYs were seen in those over 70 years old. From 1990 to 2021, standardized by age, the prevalence rate decreased by 40.01%, while the incidence rate of asthma decreased by 29.89%. However, this decrease in asthma burden occurred predominantly in men rather than women. The mortality burden for women increased consistently from 1990 to 2021, while male mortality remained relatively stable.

== Region specific data ==
From 1990 to 2021, the global burden of asthma as measured by age-standardized rate (ASR) for GBD 2021 has shown a declining trend. However, global asthma prevalence and burden vary significantly by country, with higher diagnosis rates in developed nations and higher mortality rates in low-resource regions. As of 2021, an analysis of asthma burden across 21 global regions showed the highest incidences in South Asia, East Asia, and high-income North America. The regions with the highest age-standardized incidence rate (ASIR) per 100,000 were high-income North America, the Caribbean and Central Europe. The regions with the lowest ASIR per 100,000 were Southern Sub-Saharan Africa, South Asia, and East Asia. GBD 2021 further reported on four attributable risk factors for asthma. Ordered by global impact they were: high body mass index (BMI), occupational exposure to asthmagens, nitrogen dioxide (NO_{2}) pollution, and smoking. Similar to prevalence and burden, the impact of these factors varies significantly from one country to another.

=== United States ===
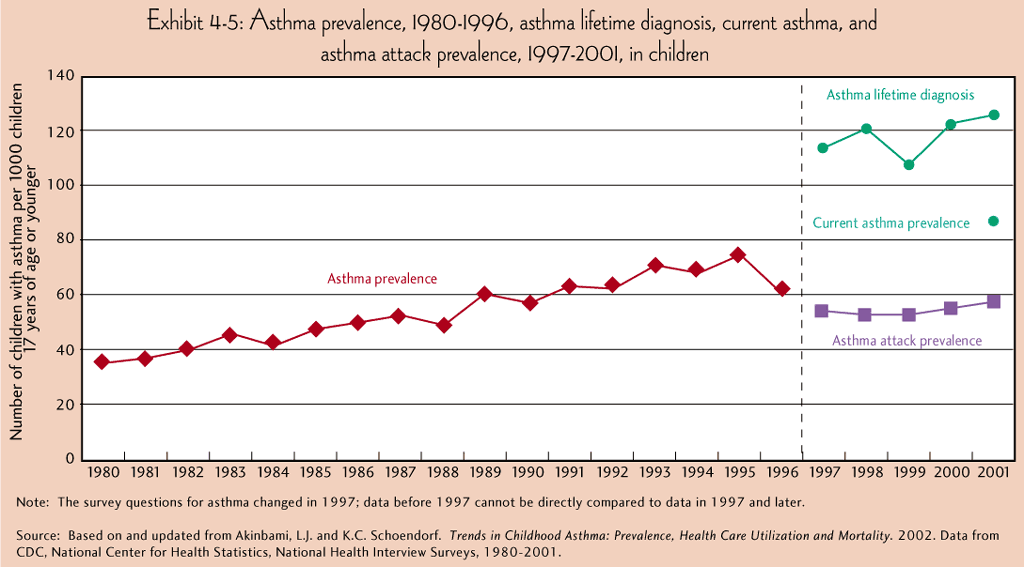
The prevalence of childhood asthma in the United States increased between 1980 and 1996, especially in younger children.

Rates of asthma increased significantly in the United States between the 1960s and 1994 with asthma being recognized as a major public health problem since the 1970s. Just 3.6% of US children had asthma in 1980, compared with 9% in 2001. The age-adjusted prevalence of asthma (ASPR) across all ages in the U.S. increased from 7.3 to 8.2 percent between 2001 and 2009. In contrast to other parts of the world, the United States has continued to show an upward trend in both age-standardized prevalence rates (ASPR) and age-standardized DALY rates (ASDR) from 1990 to 2021.

A study of NHANES data from adults between 1999 to 2020 reported that asthma affected 8.7% of the adult U.S. population, with people aged 60 or older having the highest asthma prevalence at 34.0%. Females were 1.76 times more likely to have asthma than males: 64.0% of asthma patients were female and 36.0% were male. In addition, the prevalence of asthma significantly increased over time among females. Asthma was most likely to affect those who were female, low income, obese, and smokers. Obese individuals were 1.74 times more likely to have current asthma compared to underweight individuals. Asthma prevalence varies drastically between ethnic populations. Prevalence was highest among non-hispanic whites (46.4%) followed by non-hispanic blacks (26.0%), Mexican Americans (9.6%) and other hispanics (9.0%). Asthma prevalence also differs between populations of the same ethnicity who were born in different places and have lived for different lengths of time in the U.S. Mexican populations born in the U.S., for example, have higher asthma rates than Mexican populations living in but not born in the U.S.

A study of data from the National Health Interview Survey (NHIS) and other sources examined asthma-related emergency department visits and hospitalizations involving both children and adults in the U.S. Asthma exacerbations are one of the most frequent causes of pediatric emergency department (ED) visits. In 2021, more than 22 million people, including 6 million children, were hospitalized 500,000 times for asthma. While asthma prevalence decreased annually for children from 2010 through 2021, it increased annually for adults from 2013 to 2021. For both children and adults, prevalence of current asthma was higher among non-hispanic black people compared with non-hispanic white people. People with low incomes disproportionately experience adverse outcomes, which may reflect factors such as housing quality, environmental exposures, and availability of health care.

=== United Kingdom ===
An examination of data from the National Health Service (England) (NHSE) and other sources reported the prevalence of asthma in 2019 in the UK as England (9.7%), Wales (15.9%), Scotland (13.2%) and Northern Ireland (7.0%). Incidence rates of asthma were lower in 2019 than in 2005. Adult women had higher rates of asthma than men, while males under 18 years of age had higher rates of asthma than females under 18.

Between 2014-15 and 2019-20 more than 5,100 women in the United Kingdom died from an asthma attack compared with fewer than 2,300 men. Based on emergency hospital admissions in England, among all admissions 20 to 49 years old, women were 2.5 times more likely to be admitted to hospital for asthma treatment compared with men.

=== Canada ===
As of 2024, Asthma Canada reported that asthma, the third most prevalent chronic disease in Canada, affected 4.8 million people, about 1 million of them children under 18. Data shows an increasing trend in asthma prevalence among Canada's population. In 2000-2001 asthma prevalence was monitored at 6.5%; by 2010-2011 asthma prevalence totaled 10.8% of Canada's population. In 2023, the age- and sex-standardized prevalence of asthma for adults over 18 in Canada was estimated as 11.1%.

When broken out by gender, data on adult asthma (age ≥18) from electronic medical records (EMRs) in the Canadian Primary Care Sentinel Surveillance Network (CPCSSN) database showed that women are more likely to have asthma than men. In 2023, the age- and sex-standardized prevalence of asthma was estimated as 12.2% for females and 9.9% for males. Women are also more likely to have multiple comorbidities along with asthma, such as chronic obstructive pulmonary disease, chronic heart failure, depression, coronary artery disease, diabetes and hypertension. Adult males with asthma are more likely not to have comorbid conditions.

Asthma prevalence varies among the provinces of Canada; for 2022-2023, the highest prevalence was in Ontario (13.17%), and the lowest in Nunavut(4.41%). Though there is an overall decrease in the incidence of new asthma cases in Canada, prevalence is rising. This can be attributed to a decrease in case-specific mortality due to improved management and control of asthma and its symptoms.

=== Latin and Central America ===
A meta-analysis of 24 studies published between 2005 and 2024 reported a combined overall prevalence of asthma in adults in Latin America of 6.84%. There was considerable variation among countries, ranging from Panama (10.1%) and Nicaragua (9.9%) to Peru (3.9%). Overall, prevalence of asthma was higher in women (8.87%) than men (5.17%). Asthma in Latin America tends to be poorly controlled, depending heavily on the availability of health care and medication. Childhood disease in Latin America generally is non‐atopic: it does not involve an allergic reaction or abnormal antibody response. Common childhood infections and poor hygiene tend to reduce allergic responses, but have unclear effects on asthma symptoms.

A meta-analysis comparing urban and rural populations estimated an approximately 50% greater asthma prevalence in urban populations. Children in urban areas with a history of rural-to-urban migration had a higher prevalence of asthma compared with children in urban areas who had not moved. A 2018 meta-analysis showed that children in Latin America and the Caribbean who lived in polluted environments were more likely to have asthma. Living in urban areas is associated with greater exposure to air pollution. Exposure to air pollution negatively affects asthma outcomes in both adults and children.

=== Japan ===
The mean prevalence of asthma in Japan has increased from about 1% to 10% or higher in children and to about 6–10% in adults since the 1960s. Other surveys reported that the prevalence of asthma in children had a 2-fold increase between 1982 and 2002. Three surveys done from 1985, 1999 and 2006 suggest that the prevalence of adult asthma is increasing, but that the prevalence of asthma in children is decreasing.

A study using data from the School Health Statistics Survey in Japan from 2006 to 2019 showed that the prevalence of asthma among children was related to air pollutant concentrations and regional urbanization levels. Sulfur dioxide, nitrogen dioxide, particulate matter (PM) and carbon monoxide (CO) were measured from 2006 to 2018. Concentrations of these air pollutants in metropolitan areas were higher in than in smaller centers but decreased over the analyzed periods. Age-standardized prevalence of asthma in metropolitan areas also decreased, while prevalence in towns and villages increased, lessening the disparity related to urbanization.

=== Asia ===
Using GBD 2021 data, asthma prevalence and burden were assessed for various age groups, sexes, and regions within Asia (Central, South, Southeast, East Asia and high-income Asia Pacific) from 1990 to 2021. Results showed a decline in age-standardised asthma prevalence, mortality, and DALYs from 1990 to 2021. In 2021, the number of individuals in Asia affected by asthma was estimated at 106 million. Asthma was considered a factor in 346,755 deaths in Asia in 2021.

There is evidence that increased asthma prevalence in adults over 60 in Asia is associated with age, with higher body mass index (BMI), with smoking, and with occupational exposure to asthmagens. The asthma burden from smoking is higher in older men than women in Asia. From 1990 to 2021, asthma burden in adults over 60 showed risk-specific downward trends, with the greatest decline in asthma burden related to decreases in smoking. However, trends varied within regions: the fastest decline in smoking-related age-standardized DALY rates (ASDR) occurred in the high-income Asian Pacific; relatively low smoking-related ASDRs were found in East Asia and Central Asia; and some of the highest global ASDRs occurred in Southeast Asia and South Asia. The impact of occupational asthma exposure as a risk factor for older Asians also decreased between 1990 and 2021.

Initiatives such as the International Study of Asthma and Allergies in Childhood (ISAAC) and the Global Asthma Network (GAN) assess data on the occurrence of asthma among children and adolescents. An examination of data between 1993 and 2020 reported that both children aged 6–7 years and adolescents aged 13–14 years showed decreased prevalence of current wheeze in South-East Asia and the Western Pacific, but with considerable variation by country and economic conditions. Current wheeze prevalence tended to decrease in low-income countries, increase in lower-middle-income countries, and be stable in upper-middle-income and high-income countries. Differences between and within regions reflect a wide variety of factors, from genetics to environmental conditions and the availability of health care.

=== International migration ===
A 2025 meta-analysis concluded that being an immigrant is associated with a lower risk of asthma. Among immigrants, living in a host country for at least 10 years is associated with increased asthma. In a review of studies on the prevalence of asthma among migrant populations, those born in high-income countries were found to have higher rates of asthma than migrants. Second-generation migrants had a higher risk of asthma than first-generation migrants, and the prevalence of asthma increases with longer time of residence in the host country.

== Region specific economic impact ==
A global modelling analysis of 154 countries and territories estimated the global economic burden attributable to asthma by country in 2024 US$. Projected labor losses were based on reductions in the workforce due to premature death and reduced participation due to disability. Projected economic burden differed widely by country. Productivity reductions were strongest in lower-to-middle income countries (LMICs), and physical capital-related effects in high-income settings. The three countries with the highest economic burden were the USA (US$471 billion), the UK (US$45 billion) and China (US$44 billion).

Country-level estimates of the economic burden of asthma (selected countries)
Country	Region	Total economic costs (2024 US$; millions)	Per capita cost (2024 US$)
Australia	East Asia and Pacific	21245 (14604–36642)	710 (488–1224)
Cambodia	East Asia and Pacific	187 (103–379)	9 (5–19)
China	East Asia and Pacific	43832 (27115–81360)	30 (19–56)
Fiji	East Asia and Pacific	50 (30–89)	50 (30–88)
Japan	East Asia and Pacific	15974 (10635–29564)	139 (92–257)
Myanmar	East Asia and Pacific	545 (299–1035)	9 (5–17)
New Zealand	East Asia and Pacific	2407 (1586–4269)	450 (296–798)
Denmark	Europe and central Asia	2589 (1602–5008)	424 (263–821)
Finland	Europe and central Asia	2471 (1548–4719)	445 (279–850)
France	Europe and central Asia	25528 (15522–49835)	380 (231–742)
Germany	Europe and central Asia	24922 (15979–45989)	303 (195–560)
Greece	Europe and central Asia	890 (481–1904)	93 (50–198)
Iceland	Europe and central Asia	262 (136–574)	714 (371–1562)
Ireland	Europe and central Asia	4450 (2758–8856)	821 (509–1634)
Italy	Europe and central Asia	7469 (4339–15 365)	130 (75–267)
Luxembourg	Europe and central Asia	657 (367–1415)	901 (504–1940)
Montenegro	Europe and central Asia	24 (12–59)	39 (19–96)
Spain	Europe and central Asia	6929 (4262–13 291)	153 (94–293)
Tajikistan	Europe and central Asia	34 (18–75)	3 (1–6)
UK	Europe and central Asia	45484 (27850–83969)	633 (387–1168)
Argentina	Latin America and Caribbean	5216 (3712–9057)	102 (72–176)
Bahamas	Latin America and Caribbean	86 (49–178)	195 (112–402)
Bolivia	Latin America and Caribbean	192 (131–368)	13 (9–26)
Brazil	Latin America and Caribbean	8884 (6135–14335)	39 (27–63)
Chile	Latin America and Caribbean	1795 (1204–3215)	90 (60–161)
Mexico	Latin America and Caribbean	3831 (2732–6409)	26 (19–44)
Nicaragua	Latin America and Caribbean	80 (47–170)	10 (6–22)
Peru	Latin America and Caribbean	804 (612–1366)	21 (16–36)
Suriname	Latin America and Caribbean	22 (11–50)	34 (18–76)
Venezuela	Latin America and Caribbean	548 (310–1213)	16 (9–35)
Canada	North America	14211 (9022–26420)	333 (211–618)
USA	North America	470924 (370994–655242)	1302 (1026–1812)
Djibouti	Middle East and north Africa	22 (10–53)	18 (8–45)
Israel	Middle East and north Africa	3806 (2646–6715)	346 (240–610)
Malta	Middle East and north Africa	192 (127–361)	435 (288–817)
Syria	Middle East and north Africa	122 (53–298)	4 (2–10)
Bhutan	South Asia	12 (4–31)	13 (5–36)
India	South Asia	22278 (12413–42461)	14 (8–27)
Maldives	South Asia	23 (14–48)	42 (25–87)
Pakistan	South Asia	1811 (826–4164)	6 (3–14)
Cabo Verde	Sub-Saharan Africa	11 (6–24)	18 (10–37)
Central African Republic	Sub-Saharan Africa	13 (9–24)	2 (1–4)
Eswatini	Sub-Saharan Africa	75 (37–169)	52 (25–116)
Nigeria	Sub-Saharan Africa	3528 (1758–8096)	11 (6–26)
South Africa	Sub-Saharan Africa	2755 (1957–4069)	39 (28–58)

== Social determinants ==
Disparities in the prevalence of asthma reflect differences in both socioeconomic status and physical environment. People are affected by complex interactions between race, place, poverty, and health access. Urbanization, exposure to indoor and outdoor air pollution, unhygienic housing conditions, and lack of resources for diagnosis and treatment may all contribute to frequency and severity of asthma symptoms in low-resource communities. Data from a variety of countries suggests that respiratory outcomes can be improved through the implementation of policies to reduce air pollution. According to the Global Initiative for Asthma (GINA), the adoption of best practices by primary care clinicians for the prevention and management of asthma could lower asthma morbidity and potentially mortality.

Meta-analysis confirms that lower socioeconomic status, as indicated by income and employment status, is related to more negative asthma outcomes. For example, airway reactivity and symptoms for children of low socioeconomic status in Canada tend to be higher than those of higher-income areas. In the United States, socioeconomic status is associated with race, which often acts as a proxy for complex interactions between genetic ancestry and environmental and social factors related to systematic racism and poverty. As a result, racial and ethnic minorities tend to be over-represented in urban areas characterized by poor housing, exposure to pollutants, and crime. Black Americans are 5 times more likely to visit an emergency department for asthma and 2-3 times more likely to die from asthma.

Inner city and rural communities have several commonalities that are important when determining socioeconomic status. They are both more likely to have higher poverty rates, and higher mortality rates, thus having a lower health status than suburban residents. Meta-analysis of results from multiple countries indicates that the prevalence of asthma is lower in rural areas, and higher in urban areas. An urban-rural gradient suggests an increase in the prevalence of asthma closer to the inner city.

Multiple factors contribute to socioeconomic disparities, including income and education, pollutant exposures and health access. Low income alone accounts for a significant increase in poor asthma outcomes, including severity, lung function, and morbidity rates. Stressors related to neighborhood violence and safety, behavioral risk factors, and lack of access to adequate medications and healthcare also contribute to an increased prevalence of asthma.

Smoking is a primary source of indoor pollutants including particulate matter, NO_{2}, and VOCs. Secondhand smoke exposure from parents or caregivers has been linked to multiple illnesses in children, including asthma. Children who live with at least one smoker are more likely to have asthma than those who don't. People living below the poverty line and with less education have a higher second-hand smoke exposure than those who do not. Adults who are unemployed are more likely to smoke than those who are employed. Those with blue-collar jobs (e.g. firefighters, farmers, and fishermen) are more likely to experience occupational exposures to smoke and to develop chronic rhinosinusitis (CRS), potentially leading to asthma. Those with service jobs such as servers and bartenders may be exposed to second-hand smoke if businesses do not follow smoking restrictions.
