= Jonathan Grigg =

British medical doctor and professor

Jonathan Grigg is a British professor of paediatric respiratory and environmental medicine at Queen Mary University of London.

He was a lead author of the Royal College of Physicians’ Report on the long-term effects of air pollution. In the area of paediatric respiratory medicine, he has led major independent and industry trials of new and existing asthma therapies.

He was Secretary of the Paediatric Assembly of the European Respiratory Society until 2017 and then became Head of the Assembly until 2023. In 2020, he became a Senior Investigator at the National Institute for Health and Care Research (NIHR).

He was the research lead of the British Paediatric Respiratory Society and was a Vice Chair of the Royal College of Physicians' working party on air pollution and authored the report "Every breath we take, the lifelong impact of air pollution".

Grigg has had various British media appearances including having been a participant in the Radio 4 program Costing the Earth, and an interview with Sky News regarding the RCP report.

Grigg is a founding member of Doctors against Diesel, a group advocating the rapid phase out of the current fleet of diesel cars, vans, and taxis.

In 2025 Grigg was elected as a Fellow of the Academy of Medical Sciences.
