= Anna Hansell =

British physician

- Education: Imperial College London
- Scientific career
- Workplaces: University of Leicester; Imperial College London
- Thesis: The epidemiology of chronic obstructive pulmonary disease in the UK : spatial and temporal variations. (2005)

Anna Louise Hansell is a British physician who is Professor of Environmental Epidemiology and Director of the Centre for Environmental Health and Sustainability at the University of Leicester. During the COVID-19 pandemic, Hansell studied the relationship between pollution and COVID-19.

== Education and early career ==
Hansell originally studied medicine. She spent six years working in clinical medicine, before specialising in public health. Hansell completed her doctoral research at Imperial College London on the epidemiology of chronic obstructive pulmonary disease (COPD) in the United Kingdom. After completing her doctoral degree she was awarded a Wellcome Trust clinical research fellowship.

== Research and academic service ==
Her research considers environmental noise and air pollution. As part of this effort, Hansell made use of historical data and models to estimate black smoke and sulphur dioxide levels across the United Kingdom in 1971, 1981, 1991 and 2001. She demonstrated that living in high levels of air pollution in the past increased people's risks of respiratory disease decades after exposure. For example, people who lived in polluted areas in 1971 had a 14% greater risk of dying in 2002 than people who lived in low pollution areas.

Hansell has studied the impact of air pollution on birth outcomes, working primarily with mothers in London. Her work showed that in 3% of babies born with a low birth weight the low weight can be attributed to maternal residential exposure to air pollutants. She went on to demonstrate that exposure to air pollution, particularly PM10 particulates due to road traffic, in the first trimester and early life can reduce children's lung function.

In 2014 Hansell launched the Small Health Area Statistics Unit Environment and Health Atlas. The atlas visualised local risk factors for fourteen different diseases, as well as providing details about common environmental agents. Hansell has continued to study the COPD throughout her career, combining data from the UK Biobank with air pollution monitoring systems. She showed that annual increases of 5 μgm^{−3} PM2.5 particulates in air was comparable to two years of ageing. These investigations allowed her to identify that i populations who live in areas where PM2.5 levels are above the maximum levels recommended by the World Health Organization, COPD is four times higher than in people who experience passive smoking. She has also demonstrated that people who live in low income households are considerably more likely to be detrimentally impacted by air pollution.

Alongside investigating the impact of air pollution, Hansell has studied the impact of noise pollution on mortality. By combining data on hospital admissions and mortality of a cohort of over three million people who live around Heathrow Airport, Hansell showed that deaths due to stroke, heart and circulatory disease are more likely in areas with high levels of aircraft noise.

During the COVID-19 pandemic, it became apparent that air pollution might play a role in the severity of COVID-19. Hansell investigated the relationships between air pollution and rates of mortality due to coronavirus. Alongside her own research, Hansell provided expert advice on the relationship between pollution, health and viral infection. She remarked that the lockdown in the United Kingdom would result in significant reductions in air pollution, in line with travel restrictions and reduced industry operation.

=== Academic service ===
She was appointed the President of Epidemiology in the Royal Society of Medicine in 2005. In 2010 Hansell was made Assistant Director of the UK Small Area Health Statistics Unit at Imperial College London. Hansell is a member of the Public Health England Environmental Hazards Programme Board, as well as the Government of the United Kingdom Committee on the Medical Effects of Air Pollutants.

== Selected publications ==
- Hansell, A.L.; Walk, J.A.; Soriano, J.B. (2003). "What do chronic obstructive pulmonary disease patients die from? A multiple cause coding analysis". European Respiratory Journal. 22 (5): 809–814. doi:10.1183/09031936.03.00031403. ISSN 0903-1936. PMID 14621089.
- Soriano, Joan B.; Visick, George T.; Muellerova, Hana; Payvandi, Nassrin; Hansell, Anna L. (2005). "Patterns of Comorbidities in Newly Diagnosed COPD and Asthma in Primary Care". Chest. 128 (4): 2099–2107. doi:10.1378/chest.128.4.2099. ISSN 0012-3692. PMID 16236861.
- Lopez, AD; Shibuya, K; Rao, C; Mathers, CD; Hansell, AL; Held, LS; Schmid, V; Buist, S (February 2006). "Chronic obstructive pulmonary disease: current burden and future projections". The European Respiratory Journal. 27 (2): 397–412. doi:10.1183/09031936.06.00025805. PMID 16452599.
- Hansell, A. L; Beale, L. A; Ghosh, R. E; Fortunato, L; Fecht, D; Järup, L; Elliott, P; Davies, S. C; Imperial College, London (2014). The environment and health atlas for England and Wales. Oxford University Press. ISBN 978-0-19-870694-6. OCLC 863684088.
