= Institute of Air Quality Management =

- Founded: 2002
- Purpose: Air quality
- Location: London, UK
- Method: Support, research, education
- Chair: Sarah Horrocks (2026)
- Website: Official website

The Institute of Air Quality Management (IAQM) was launched in November 2002 to provide a focal point for all air quality professionals.

Air quality is a material consideration in planning decisions. Major residential or commercial developments are likely to impact air quality and will normally require an air quality assessment as part of the planning application. Most assessments in England and Wales refer to guidance from IAQM and Environmental Protection UK on threshold criteria for establishing significant impacts on air quality.

IAQM has published odour guidelines for how smells should be considered in the planning process. IAQM has also published guidance in the areas of air quality monitoring for brownfield projects, demolition and construction sites, nature conservation sites, and indoor developments (residential, commercial, retail, education, community facility, and healthcare).
