= Air pollution in the United Kingdom =

Overview of the air pollution in the UK

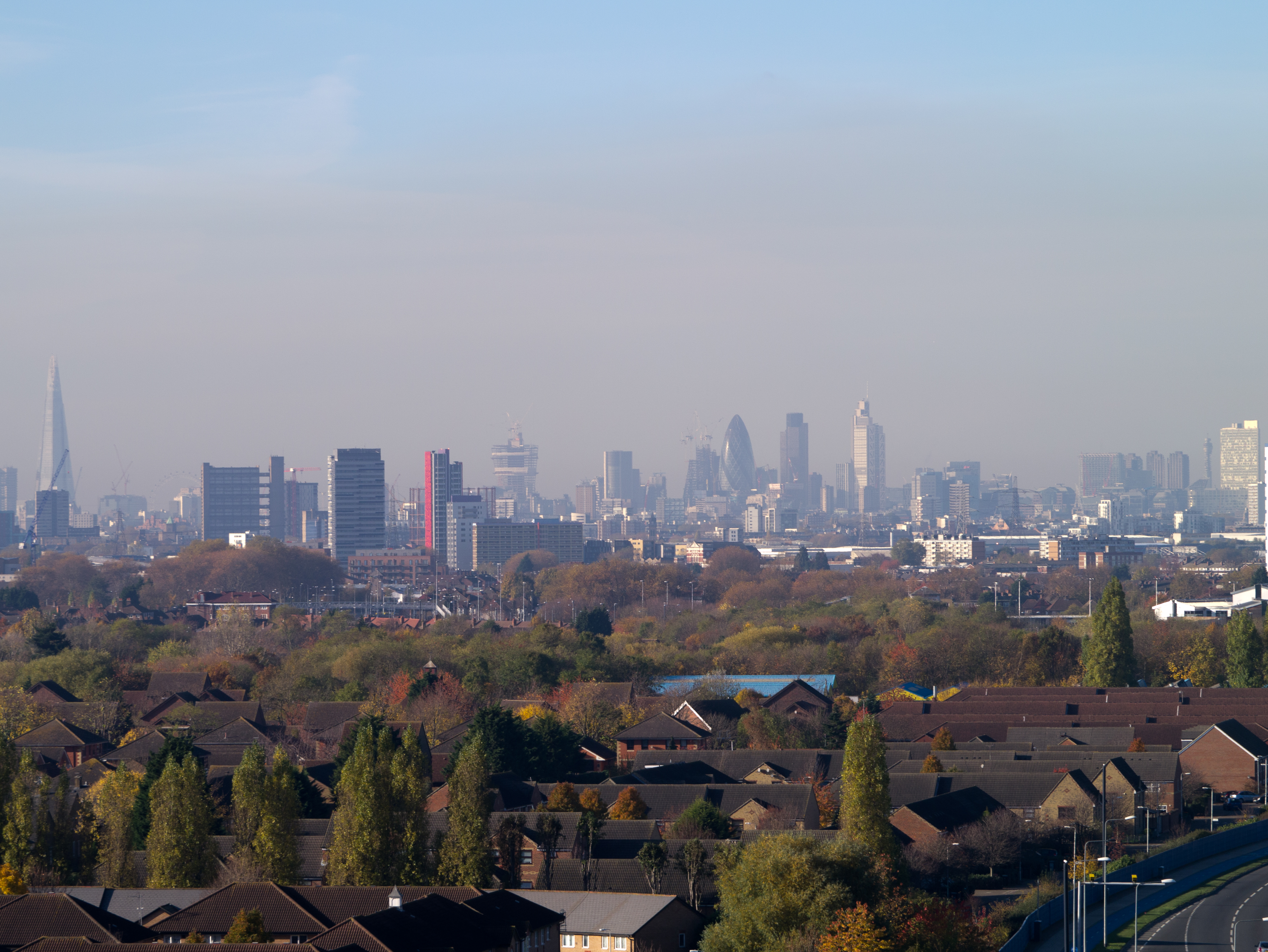
Low-lying haze over London caused by air pollution

Air pollution in the United Kingdom has long been considered a significant health issue, and it causes numerous other environmental problems such as damage to buildings, forests, and crops. Many areas, including major cities like London, are found to be significantly and regularly above legal and recommended pollution levels. Air pollution in the UK is a major cause of diseases such as asthma, lung disease, stroke, cancer, and heart disease, and it costs the health service, society, and businesses over £20 billion each year. Outdoor pollution alone is estimated to cause 40,000 early deaths each year, which is about 8.3% of deaths.

Air pollution is monitored and regulated. Air quality targets for particulates, nitrogen dioxide and ozone, set by the Department for Environment, Food and Rural Affairs (DEFRA), are mostly aimed at local government representatives responsible for the management of air quality in cities, where air quality management is the most urgent. In 2017, research by the Lancet Countdown on Health and Climate Change and the Royal College of Physicians revealed that air pollution levels in 44 cities in the UK are above the recommended World Health Organization guidelines.

The UK government has plans to improve pollution due to traffic, mainly through the introduction of urban Clean Air Zones and banning the sale of new fossil fuel cars by 2030. It has also phased out the use of coal in its electrical power generation.

== History ==
=== Prehistory to the 20th century ===
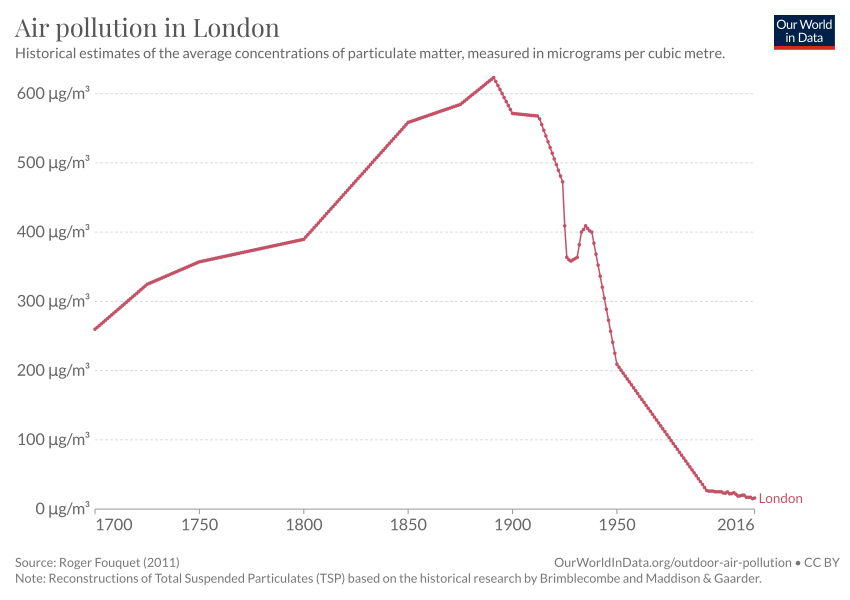
Estimated air pollution in London from 1700 to 2016

Air pollution is often assumed to have begun with the Industrial Revolution, but it's a much older problem.

Mining has existed in Great Britain since prehistoric times and lead mines (such as Charterhouse in Somerset and Odin Mine in Derbyshire) may have been worked before Roman Britain. The Pipe Rolls refer to lead and silver smelting in the Middle Ages. Research on a Swiss ice-core indicates that atmospheric pollution containing lead between the years 1170 and 1216 was as high as that during the Industrial Revolution, correlating accurately with smelting in the Peak District, the primary European source of lead and silver at the time, with spikes in pollution associated closely with the increasing power of successive monarchs during their reigns.

In 1306, Edward I introduced the first prohibitive environmental law, against the usage of 'sea coal' from Northumbria. Sulphur-rich coal from this exposed seam was increasingly being used because of dwindling supplies of wood in and around cities, but it produced stifling smoke and fumes. The legislation made little difference to the population even up to Elizabeth I's time.

By the 1600s, smoke pollution was also having an effect on building exteriors. In a landmark legal case from 1610, judgment was awarded to William Aldred against his neighbour, with references to the smell of pig sties and fumes from lime kilns, "stopping of the wholesome air" and "infecting and corrupting the air".

Through the 1800s, coal-burning for the Industrial Revolution in particular made the UK the world's leading source of carbon-based air pollution by a great margin (surpassed by the United States in 1888 and Germany in 1913). Local campaigning societies sprang up to complain about the health risks, such as the Committee for the Consumption of Smoke in Leeds. The Alkali Act 1863 was passed – and intermittently amended – to regulate irritant gaseous hydrochloric acid produced in the Leblanc process to make sodium carbonate, but also the sulphuric acid often caused by emissions from the same factories. The Public Health Act 1875 was passed, which legislated not just for the health effects of air pollution but also the visual effects.

Greater scientific efforts to measure air pollution played an increasing part in drawing attention to the problem. Robert Angus Smith made the first measurements of acid rain from rain samples in 1852. During the early 20th century, scientific studies were driven by the Committee for the Investigation of Atmospheric Pollution (later known as the Advisory Committee on Atmospheric Pollution), a group of scientists including Irish physician and environmental engineer John Switzer Owens and Sir Napier Shaw, linked to the Met Office, who greatly advanced the systematic study and measurement of pollution using a network of deposit gauges.

Experiments by the London County Council and the Meteorological Council from 1902 to 1903 found that 20% of London fogs were due to smoke alone, all were made denser and longer-lasting by smoke and that the death rate "enormously expands" during the fogs. By the 20th century – at least – respiratory diseases were the UK's biggest killers [the death-rate from bronchitis in the UK remained the highest in the world in the early 1950s, 65 per 100,000 in England and Wales, more than twice than of the nearest other country, Belgium].

=== The Great Smog of 1952 ===
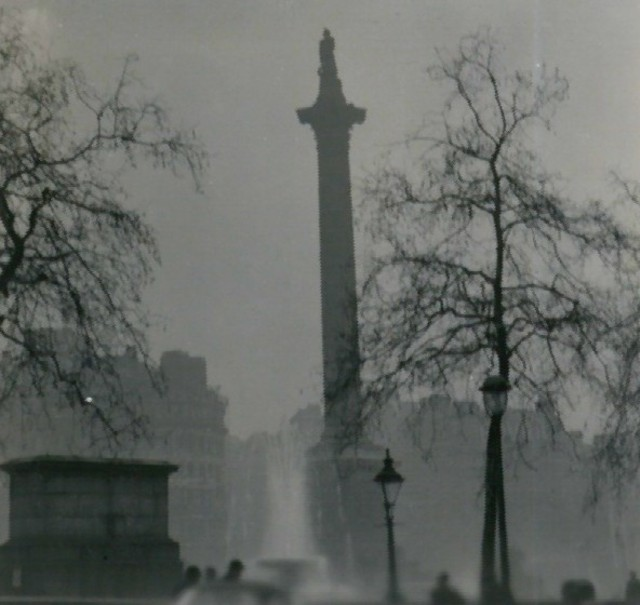
The Great Smog of 1952 in London

Early in December 1952, a cold fog descended upon London. Because of the cold, Londoners began to burn more coal than usual. The resulting air pollution was trapped by the inversion layer formed by the dense mass of cold air. Concentrations of pollutants, coal smoke in particular, built up dramatically. The problem was made worse by use of low-quality, high-sulphur coal for home heating in London in order to permit export of higher-quality coal, because of the country's tenuous postwar economic situation. The "fog", or smog, was so thick that driving became difficult or impossible. The extreme reduction in visibility was accompanied by an increase in criminal activity as well as transportation delays and a virtual shut down of the city. During the 4 day period of smog, some 3,000–4,000 people were estimated to have died, though more recent estimates suggest the actual figure may have been as high as 12,000.

=== Recent history ===
Four years after the Great London Smog, Parliament passed the Clean Air Act 1956, which made a substantial difference to urban air quality. Even so, air pollution remains a serious environmental issue in the UK over half a century later.

In April 2014, for example, there were warnings of 'very high' air pollution for many areas of England. High levels of pollution in London and other parts of the south east of England were bad enough to cause sore eyes and sore throats and experts warned those with heart conditions and asthma to stay inside.

Attempts to tackle air pollution through legislation have also continued. On 29 April 2015, the UK Supreme Court ruled that the government must take immediate action to cut air pollution, following a case brought by environmental lawyers at ClientEarth.

== Published pollution information ==
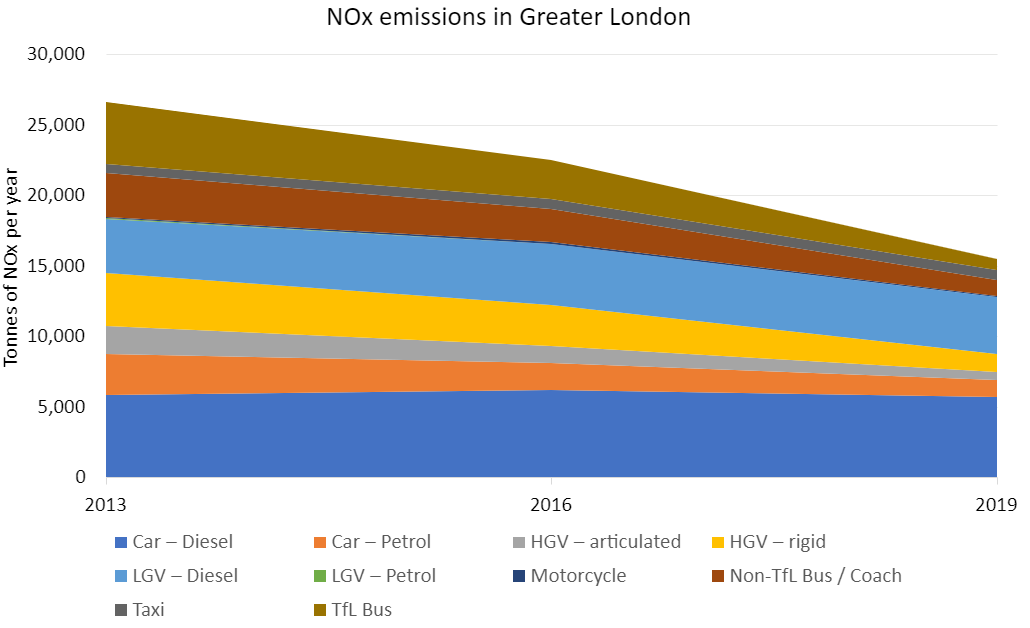
NOx emissions from road transport in Greater London (GLA boundary) from 2013 to 2019

Sources of air pollution in the UK, PM2.5, 2016

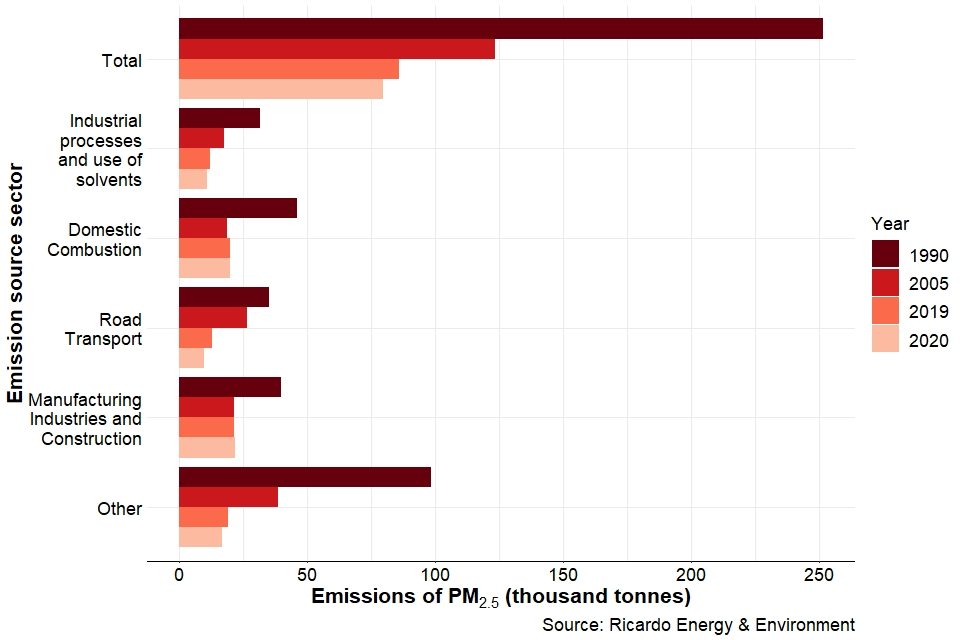
Annual emissions of PM2.5 by major emissions sources (1990, 2005, 2019 and 2020). Emissions from some sectors (e.g., road transport) have decreased sharply while that from other sectors (e.g., domestic combustion, manufacturing industries and construction) have remained roughly the same or even increased since 2005.

The UK has established an air quality network where levels of the key air pollutants are published by monitoring centres. Air quality in Oxford, Bath and London is particularly poor. One study performed by the Calor Gas company and published in The Guardian newspaper compared walking in Oxford on an average day to smoking over sixty light cigarettes.

The UK Air Quality Archive contains more precise information which permits a city's management of pollutants to be compared against the national air quality objectives set by DEFRA in 2000

Localized peak values are often cited, but average values are also important to human health. The UK National Air Quality Information Archive offers almost real-time monitoring of "current maximum" air pollution measurements for many UK towns and cities. This source offers a wide range of constantly updated data, including:

- Hourly Mean Ozone (μg/m^{3})
- Hourly Mean Nitrogen dioxide (μg/m^{3})
- Maximum 15-Minute Mean Sulphur dioxide (μg/m^{3})
- 8-Hour Mean Carbon monoxide (mg/m^{3})
- 24-Hour Mean PM_{10} (μg/m^{3} Grav Equiv)

DEFRA acknowledges that air pollution has a significant effect on health and has produced a simple banding index system that is used to create a daily warning system that is issued by the BBC Weather Service to indicate air pollution levels. DEFRA has published guidelines for people suffering from respiratory and heart diseases.

Patients visiting doctors' surgeries, health centres and hospitals are exposed to polluted air that breaches WHO guidelines. A third of GP surgeries and a quarter of hospitals are in areas that breach WHO guidelines. Pollutants, notably toxic particles emitted by diesel vehicles, are linked to lifelong health issues like asthma, chronic obstructive pulmonary disease, heart disease, strokes and lung cancer among others.

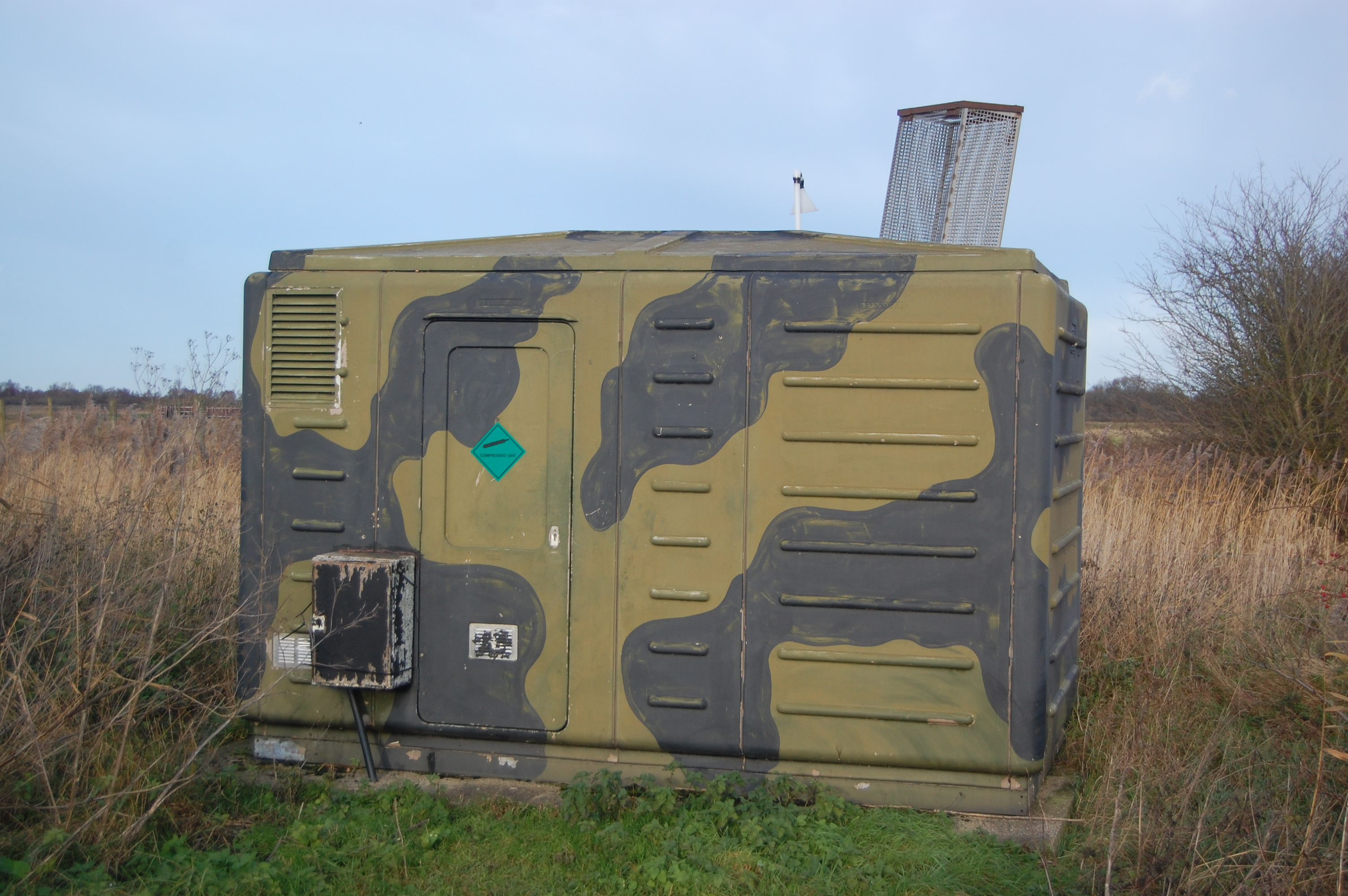
UK Department for Environment Food and Rural Affairs air quality monitoring station (UK-AIR ID: UKA00362) at the National Trust's Wicken Fen nature reserve

Pollutants, notably toxic particles emitted by diesel vehicles are entering children's lungs, potentially getting into their blood streams and their brains. This can affect children's long-term health, even lifelong health, their life expectancies and their intelligence. The government lost three high court cases because its plans to deal with air pollution were considered too weak; green groups and clean air campaigners frequently criticise the government. Air pollution leads to the equivalent of 40,000 early deaths, seriously impacts the lives of hundreds of thousands more, and costs the NHS and social care services £40m annually. The UK has also been taken to the European court due to air pollution. Queen Mary University of London published research on children's exposure to air pollution across the school day and found that they were disproportionately exposed to higher doses of pollution during the school run and whilst at school – particularly at break time in the school playground.

The Royal College of Paediatrics and Child Health, the Royal College of Physicians and Unicef are concerned over winter 2018/2019. Air pollution will worsen as people burn fuel to heat their homes. When people's respiratory systems are weakened through air pollution low temperatures will weaken them further this particularly affects children and elderly people. It is feared hospital patients with respiratory problems will add to the pressure on the NHS which is regularly overburdened in winter.

As of 2018, approximately 4.5 million children in the UK (one in three) is growing up in a town or city with unsafe levels of particulate pollution.

A study reviewing changes in the measured concentrations of nitrogen dioxide, PM_{2.5} and ozone across the UK over the period 2015-2024 found that nitrogen dioxide and PM_{2.5} had decreased by ~30-35% on average over the decade while ozone had increased by 17%.

== Remediation ==
Toxic air leads to the equivalent of around 40,000 early deaths a year in the UK – 9,000 in London – and it leaves hundreds of thousands more suffering serious long-term health problems.

=== London ===
London mayor Sadiq Khan launched the Ultra Low Emission Zone (ULEZ) in April 2019 which involves a charge on older diesel and petrol cars with £12.50 per day. Busses pay £100 per day. This follows the London low emission zone plan operating since 2008. The ULEZ was expected to cause a 20% reduction in road traffic emissions and resulted in a drop of the worst polluting vehicles entering the zone each day from 35,578 in March to 26,195 in April after the charge was introduced. A poll in April 2019 by YouGov found that 72% of Londoners supported using emissions charging to tackle both air pollution and congestion.

The zone was extended to the North and South Circular from 2021 so that it covers an area containing 3.8 million people. A month into the expansion, TfL said that the proportion of compliant vehicles had risen from 87% to 92%, and the number of the most polluting vehicles had fallen by over a third (from 127,000 to 80,000 on weekdays). The zone was further extended to the whole of Greater London in August 2023.

On the other hand, COMEAP has reported on the relative risks of breathing air pollution in different situations. In January 2019, for example, it reported that pollution from particulates is up to 30 times higher on the London Underground than on streets in the roads above, with the Northern Line having the worst air quality.

==== European controversy ====
In Europe, Council Directive 96/62/EC on ambient air quality assessment and management provides a common strategy against which member states can "set objectives for ambient air quality in order to avoid, prevent or reduce harmful effects on human health and the environment ... and improve air quality where it is unsatisfactory".

In July 2008, in the case Dieter Janecek v. Freistaat Bayern, the European Court of Justice ruled that under this directive citizens have the right to require national authorities to implement a short term action plan that aims to maintain or achieve compliance to air quality limit values.

This important case law appears to confirm the role of the EC as centralised regulator to European nation-states as regards air pollution control. It places a supranational legal obligation on the UK to protect its citizens from dangerous levels of air pollution, furthermore superseding national interests with those of the citizen.

In 2010, the European Commission (EC) threatened the UK with legal action against the successive breaching of PM_{10} limit values. The UK government has identified that if fines are imposed, they could cost the nation upwards of £300 million per year.

In March 2011, the Greater London Built-up Area remained the only UK region in breach of the EC's limit values, and was given three months to implement an emergency action plan aimed at meeting the EU Air Quality Directive. The City of London has dangerous levels of PM_{10} concentrations, estimated to cause 3000 deaths per year within the city. As well as the threat of EU fines, in 2010 it was threatened with legal action for scrapping the western congestion charge zone, which is claimed to have led to an increase in air pollution levels.

In response to these charges, mayor of London Boris Johnson has criticised the current need for European cities to communicate with Europe through their nation state's central government, arguing that in future "A great city like London" should be permitted to bypass its government and deal directly with the European Commission regarding its air quality action plan.

This can be interpreted as recognition that cities can transcend the traditional national government organisational hierarchy and develop solutions to air pollution using global governance networks, for example through transnational relations. Transnational relations include but are not exclusive to national governments and intergovernmental organisations, allowing sub-national actors including cities and regions to partake in air pollution control as independent actors.

=== England Air management ===
If a local authority finds an area where the targets are not likely to be met, it must declare it an Air Quality Management Area (AQMA) and produce a Local Air Quality Action Plan to improve the air quality. DEFRA has published a list of local authorities with AQMAs. The action plan may include measures for idle reduction of vehicle engines. An example is the Metropolitan Borough of Dudley.

=== Government ===
==== Domestic combustion ====
In the United Kingdom domestic combustion is the largest single source of PM_{2.5} and PM_{10} annually, with domestic wood burning in both closed stoves and open fires responsible for 38% of PM_{2.5} in 2019.

To tackle the problem some new laws were introduced. Starting from May 2021, traditional house coal (bituminous coal) and wet wood, two of the most polluting fuels, can no longer be sold. Wood sold in volumes of less than 2m^{3} must be certified as 'Ready to Burn', which means it has a moisture content of 20% or less. Manufactured solid fuels must also be certified as 'Ready to Burn' to ensure they meet sulphur and smoke emission limits. Starting from 2022, all new wood burning stoves have to meet new EcoDesign standards (Ecodesign stoves produce 450 times more toxic air pollution than gas central heating. Older stoves, which are now banned from sale, produce 3,700 times more). In 2023, the amount of smoke that burners in "smoke control areas" - most England's towns and cities - can emit per hour is reduced from 5g to 3g. Violation will result in an on-the-spot fine of up to £300 and may even get a criminal record.

==== Road transport ====
On 26 July 2017, the British government announced plans to ban the sale of new petrol and diesel cars in Britain by 2040. This follows a similar announcement by the French government on 6 July 2017.

=== Industry ===
On 25 July 2017, BMW announced that it would start production of an all-electric version of the Mini at its plant in Cowley, Oxfordshire, in 2019. Volvo had earlier announced that all its new cars from 2019 would be electric or hybrid.

== Campaigning and public awareness ==
Air pollution has been simultaneously tackled as both a scientific problem (needing further research) and an environmental and public health issue (requiring changes in public behaviour) in the UK since the late 19th century.

Scientists who set out to investigate air pollution often found themselves raising awareness of the problem and sometimes actively campaigning against it. Robert Angus Smith lectured on subjects such as urban sanitation and acid rain and, in the 1840s, wrote two lengthy, heartfelt letters to The Manchester Guardian highlighting the problem of air pollution, noting: "The gloominess and uncleanness is everywhere around us; the depression of filth on the spirits and on the pockets is continually before our eyes; the destruction of our landscapes and of our town views is undoubted, and can we fail to look upon this as a small evil?" The meteorologist Rollo Russell, who warned of London's dangerous "fogs" in 1880, over 70 years before the Great London Smog, has been described as a "forceful" campaigner, while John Switzer Owens, who helped to establish pollution monitoring across the UK, was closely linked to the first major British air pollution campaign group, the Coal Smoke Abatement Society (CSAS), established in 1898 (later renamed the National Society for Clean Air and now known as Environmental Protection UK).

British air pollution campaigning currently involves a mixture of grassroots activism (by groups such as Mums for Lungs and individual campaigners such as Rosamund Kissi-Debrah), public health awareness (through events such as Clean Air Day), legal work (advanced by activist lawyers such as ClientEarth), and more traditional campaigning (by environmental groups such as Greenpeace and Friends of the Earth, public health advocacy groups such as British Lung Foundation and Asthma UK, and organizations that raise health and safety issues, such as the British Safety Council). Citizen science projects combine scientific research with public health awareness raising and grassroots environmental campaigning.

UK government advisory bodies such as the Air Quality Expert Group (AQEG) and Committee on the Medical Effects of Air Pollutants (COMEAP) are not campaigning organizations, but activists and journalists often draw on their scientific reports to support campaign work and media articles designed to raise public awareness. Academic scientists, such as Frank Kelly (of Imperial College) and Alastair Lewis (of the National Centre for Atmospheric Science), who include public outreach as part of their work on air pollution, also play an important part in awareness raising and campaigning by connecting science to public policy.

== See also ==
- DAPPLE Project
- Environmental history
- Environmental issues in the United Kingdom
- Microplastics
- Pea soup fog
- Smoke abatement
- Air pollution in Canada
- Air pollution in China
- Air pollution in Germany
- Air pollution in India
  - Air pollution in Delhi
- Air pollution in South Korea
- Air pollution in Taiwan
- Air pollution in the United States
- List of countries by air pollution
  - List of most-polluted cities by particulate matter concentration
  - List of least-polluted cities by particulate matter concentration
- List of smogs by death toll
