= Air pollution in India =

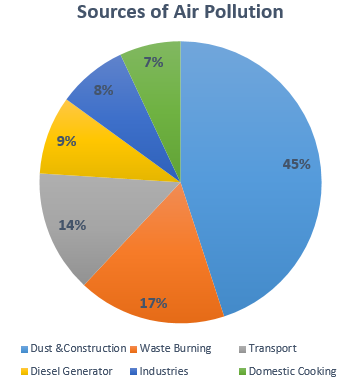
Dust & Construction contribute about 45% to the air pollution in India, which is followed by Waste Burning. Crafting activities are mostly in the urban areas while Waste Burning is in the rural areas (agriculture).

Air pollution in India is a serious environmental issue. Air pollution contributes to the premature deaths of 2 million Indians every year. Of the 30 most polluted cities in the world, 21 were in India in 2019. As per a study based on 2016 data, at least 140 million people in India breathe air that is 10 times or more over the WHO safe limit and 13 of the world's 20 cities with the highest annual levels of air pollution are in India. As per the World Air Quality Report 2023, of the 100 most polluted cities in the world, 83 are in India. The main contributors to India's particulate air pollution include industrial and vehicular emissions, construction dust and debris, dependence on thermal power for electricity, waste burning, and use of wood and dung by low-income and rural households for cooking and heating. 51% of India's air pollution is caused by industrial pollution, 27% by vehicles, 17% by crop burning and 5% by other sources. Emissions come from vehicles and industry, whereas in rural areas, much of the pollution stems from biomass burning for cooking and keeping warm. In autumn and spring months, large scale crop residue burning in agriculture fields – a cheaper alternative to mechanical tilling – is a major source of smoke, smog and particulate pollution. India has a low per capita emissions of greenhouse gases but the country as a whole is the third largest greenhouse gas producer after China and the United States. A 2013 study on non-smokers found that Indians, on average, have about 30% lower lung function compared to Europeans.

The Air (Prevention and Control of Pollution) Act was passed in 1981 to regulate air pollution but has failed to reduce pollution because of poor enforcement of the rules.

In 2015, Government of India, together with IIT Kanpur launched the National Air Quality Index. In 2019, India launched 'The National Clean Air Programme' with tentative national target of 20%-30% reduction in PM2.5 and PM10 concentrations by 2024, considering 2017 as the base year for comparison. It will be rolled out in 102 cities that are considered to have air quality worse than the National Ambient Air Quality Standards. There are other initiatives such as a 1,600-kilometre-long and 5-kilometre-wide The Great Green Wall of Aravalli green ecological corridor along Aravalli range from Gujarat to Delhi which will also connect to Shivalik hill range with planting of 1.35 billion (135 crore) new native trees over 10 years to combat the pollution. In December 2019, IIT Bombay, in partnership with the McKelvey School of Engineering of Washington University in St. Louis, launched the Aerosol and Air Quality Research Facility to study air pollution in India. According to a Lancet study, nearly 1.67 million deaths and an estimated loss of US$28.8 billion worth of output were India's prices for worsening air pollution in 2019. A 2024 study published in The Lancet Planetary Health estimated that, on average, 7.2 per cent of daily deaths in 10 of India's most polluted cities were attributable to PM2.5 levels exceeding World Health Organization guidelines. During air pollution crisis in 2025, the Union Health Ministry claimed there is no data linking air pollution to deaths while the Environment Ministry dismissed global AQI monitors as unreliable and unofficial, drawing widespread criticism from the public. Ineffective measures to curb air pollution such as ban of Tandoori food and failed cloud seeding, over-reliance on graded response action plan (GRAP) as solutions instead of emergency responses and manipulation of air monitoring stations has also been a subject of criticism.

As per The Indian Express, India was declared as the third-most polluted country in 2023, after Bangladesh and Pakistan, according to a report released by Swiss air quality monitoring body, IQAir.

== Causes ==
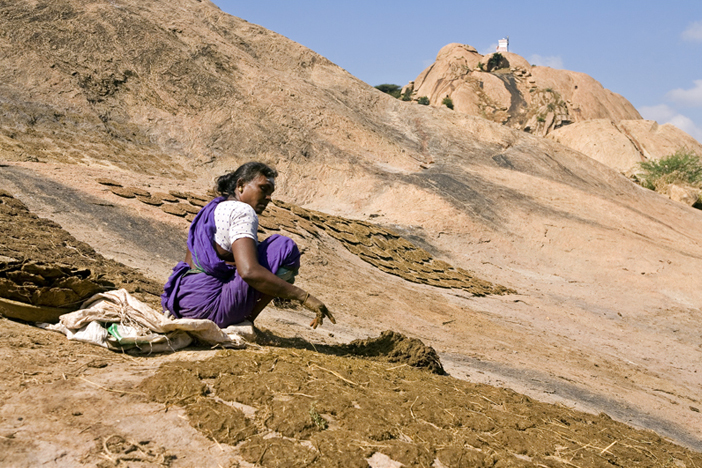
Cooking fuel in rural India is prepared from a wet mix of dried grass, fuelwood pieces, hay, leaves and mostly livestock dung. When it burns, it produces smoke and numerous indoor air pollutants at concentrations 5 times higher than coal

=== Fuel and biomass burning ===
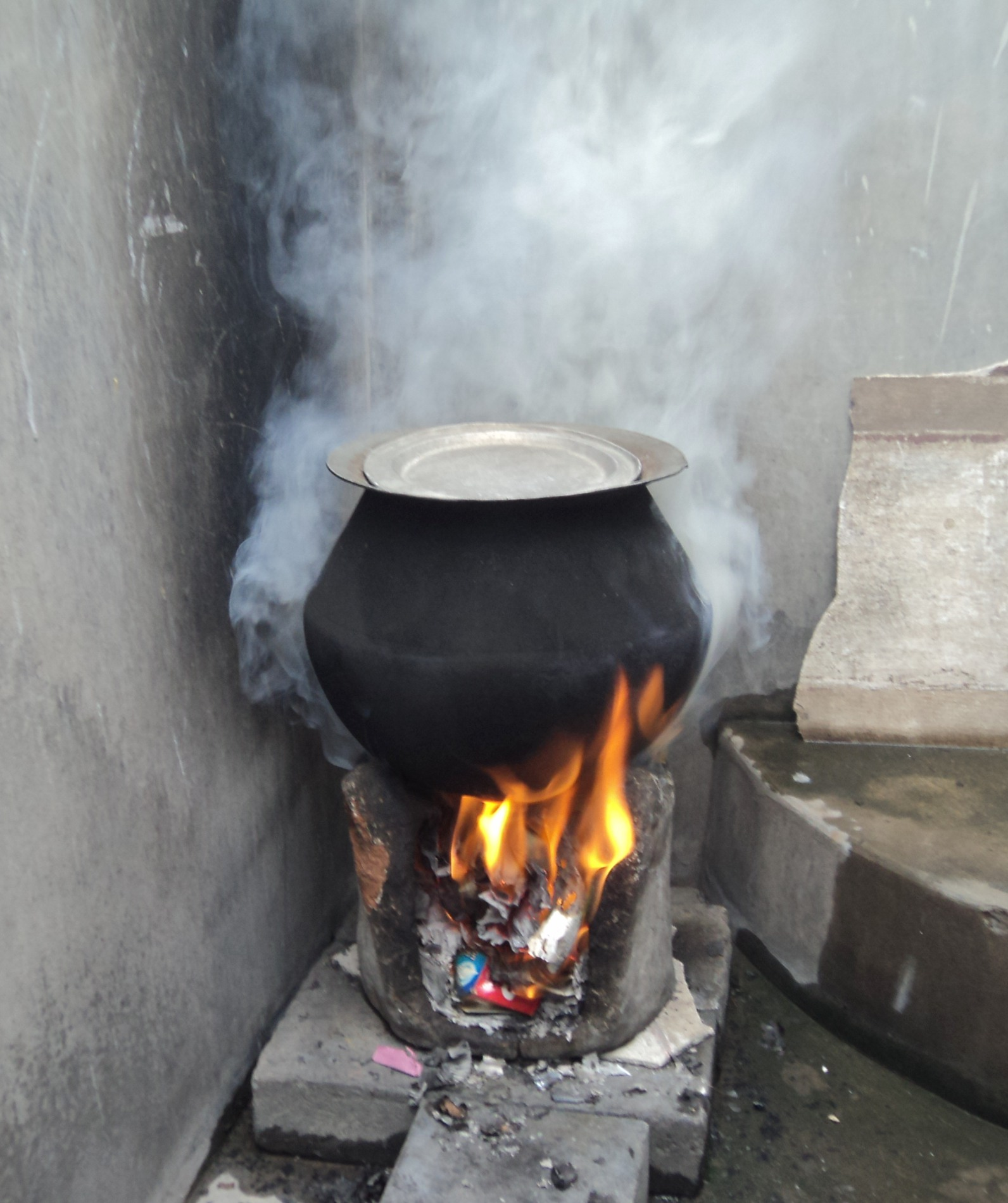
A rural aburo stove using biomass cakes, fuelwood and trash as cooking fuel. Surveys suggest over 100 million households in India use such stoves (चूल्हा) every day, 2–3 times a day. Clean burning fuels and electricity are unavailable in rural parts and small towns of India because of poor rural highways and energy infrastructure.

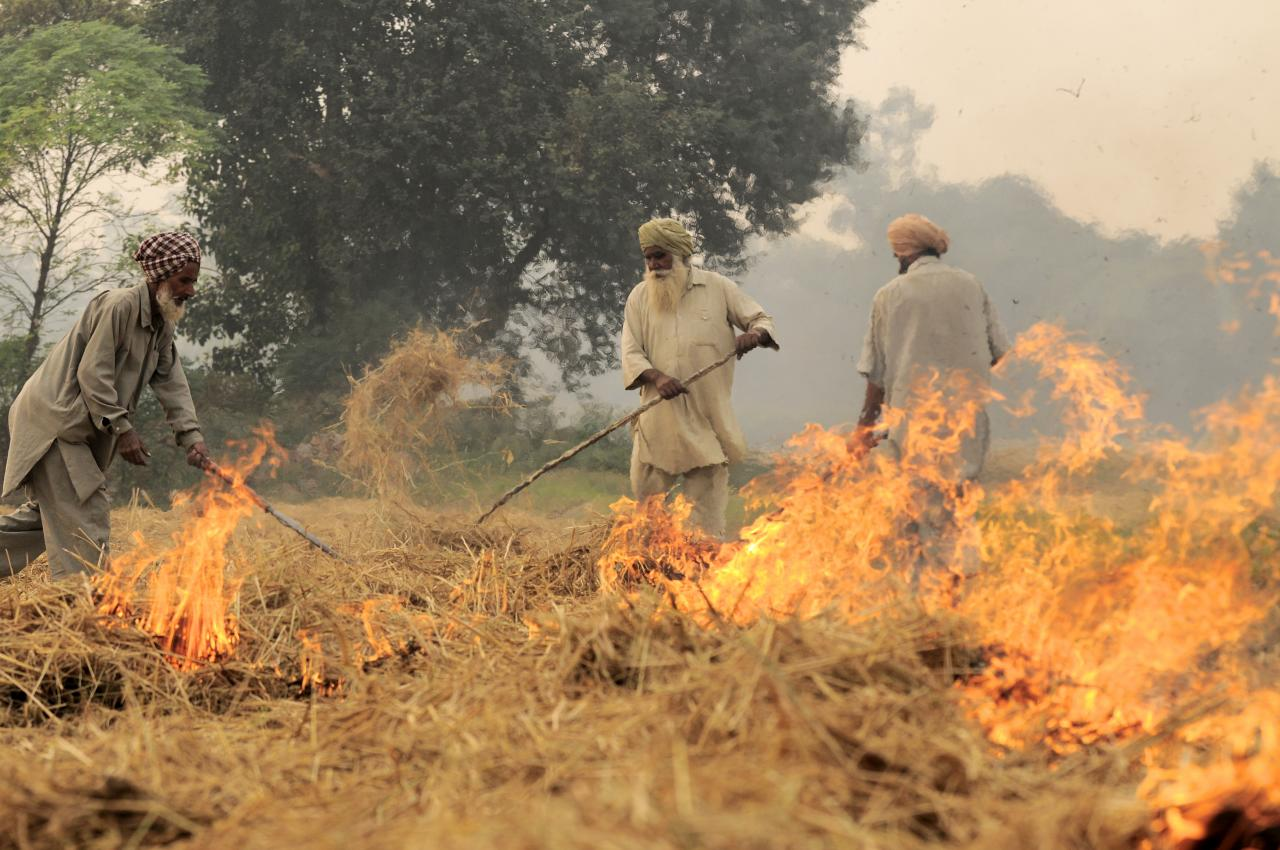
Burning of rice residues after harvest, to quickly prepare the land for wheat planting, around Sangrur, Punjab, India

Fuel wood and biomass burning is the primary reason for near-permanent haze and smoke observed above rural and urban India, and in satellite pictures of the country. Fuelwood and biomass cakes are used for cooking and general heating needs. These are burnt in cook stoves known as chulha (also chullha or chullah) in some parts of India. These cook stoves are present in over 100 million Indian households, and are used two to three times a day, daily. Some reports, including one by the World Health Organization, claim 300,000 to 400,000 people die of indoor air pollution and carbon monoxide poisoning in India because of biomass burning and use of chullhas. The carbon containing gases released from biomass fuels are many times more reactive than cleaner fuels such as liquefied petroleum gas. Air pollution is also the main cause of the Asian brown cloud, which is delaying the start of the monsoon. The Burning of biomass and firewood will not stop until electricity or clean burning fuel and combustion technologies become reliably available and widely adopted in rural and urban India.

India is the world's largest consumer of fuelwood, agricultural waste and biomass for energy purposes. From the most recent available nationwide study, India used 148.7 million tonnes coal replacement worth of fuel-wood and biomass annually for domestic energy use. India's national average annual per capita consumption of fuel wood, agricultural waste and biomass cakes was 206 kilogram coal equivalent. The overall contribution of fuelwood, including sawdust and wood waste, was about 46% of the total, the rest being agricultural waste and biomass dung cakes. Traditional fuel (fuelwood, crop residue and dung cake) dominates domestic energy use in rural India and accounts for about 90% of the total. In urban areas, this traditional fuel constitutes about 24% of the total. India burns tenfold more fuelwood every year than the United States; the fuelwood quality in India is different from the dry firewood of the United States; and, the Indian stoves in use are less efficient, thereby producing more smoke and air pollutants per kilogram equivalent.

The unsanctioned tyre pyrolysis plants, which recycle rubber tyres into low-grade oil and carbon black are widespread in India and contribute to severe air pollution and health problems.

=== Fuel adulteration ===
Some Indian taxis and auto-rickshaws run on adulterated fuel blends. Adulteration of gasoline and diesel with lower-priced fuels is common in South Asia, including India. Some adulterants increase emissions of harmful pollutants from vehicles, worsening urban air pollution. Financial incentives arising from differential taxes are generally the primary cause of fuel adulteration. In India and other developing countries, gasoline carries a much higher tax than diesel, which in turn is taxed more than kerosene meant as a cooking fuel, while some solvents and lubricants carry little or no tax.

As fuel prices rise, the public transport driver cuts costs by blending the cheaper hydrocarbon into highly taxed hydrocarbon. The blending may be as much as 20–30 percent. For a low wage driver, the adulteration can yield short term savings that are significant over the month. The consequences to long term air pollution, quality of life and effect on health are simply ignored. Also ignored are the reduced life of vehicle engine and higher maintenance costs, particularly if the taxi, auto-rickshaw or truck is being rented for a daily fee.

Adulterated fuel increases tailpipe emissions of hydrocarbons (HC), carbon monoxide (CO), oxides of nitrogen (NO_{x}) and particulate matter (PM). Air toxin emissions — which fall into the category of unregulated emissions — of primary concern are benzene and polyaromatic hydrocarbons (PAHs), both well-known carcinogens. Kerosene is more difficult to burn than gasoline, its addition results in higher levels of HC, CO and PM emissions even from catalyst-equipped cars. The higher sulfur level of kerosene is another issue.

=== Traffic congestion ===
Traffic congestion is severe in India's cities and towns. Traffic congestion is caused by several reasons, some of which are: increase in number of vehicles per kilometre of available roads, a lack of intra-city divided-lane highways and intra-city expressways networks, lack of inter-city expressways, traffic accidents and chaos due to poor enforcement of traffic laws.

Traffic congestion reduces the average traffic speed. At low speeds, scientific studies reveal that vehicles burn fuel inefficiently and pollute more per trip. For example, a study in the United States found that for the same trip, cars consumed more fuel and polluted more if the traffic was congested, than when traffic flowed freely. An average trip speeds between 20 and 40 kilometres per hour, the cars pollutant emission was twice as much as when the average speed was 55 to 75 kilometres per hour. At average trip speeds between 5 and 20 kilometres per hour, the cars pollutant emissions were 4 to 8 times as much as when the average speed was 55 to 70 kilometres per hour. Fuel efficiencies similarly were much worse with traffic congestion.

Traffic gridlock in Delhi and other Indian cities is extreme. This has been shown to result in a build up of local pollution, particularly under stagnant conditions. The average trip speed on many Indian city roads is less than 20 kilometres per hour; a 10-kilometre trip can take 30 minutes, or more. At such speeds, vehicles in India emit air pollutants 4 to 8 times more than they would with less traffic congestion; Indian vehicles also consume a lot more carbon footprint fuel per trip, than they would if the traffic congestion was less. Emissions of particles and heavy metals increase over time because the growth of the fleet and mileage outpaces the efforts to curb emissions.

In cities like Bangalore, around 50% of children suffer from asthma.

=== Construction dust and debris ===
Construction dust and debris is one of the main contributors to particulate air pollution in India.

=== Greenhouse gas emissions ===
India's emissions per person are lower than the other major emitters, but the national total is significant.

CO2 emissions in India are significantly lower than those of China, but they are rising rapidly.quickly percentagewise.

India generates much less carbon dioxide per person than other primary regions.

India emits about 3 gigatonnes (Gt) CO_{2eq} of greenhouse gases each year which makes up about 7% of total annual global emissions.

According to data from the Climate Change Tracker, India has contributed 169,898.56 megatonnes of carbon dioxide since 1851, accounting for 4.62% of the historic total. India's per capita emissions are rated "low", at 1.85 tonnes per capita per year. However, this reflects the country's large population which dilutes the per capita footprint despite high overall emissions. Furthermore, India's energy use per capita increased by 11% from 2014 to 2019.

The Paris Agreement commitments included a reduction of this intensity by 33–35% by 2030.

The Indian national carbon trading scheme may be created in 2026.

== Effects ==
=== Health costs of air pollution ===
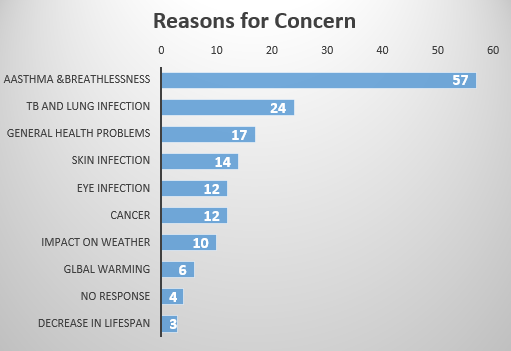
Asthma is the leading health problem faced by Indians. Not surprisingly, it accounts for more than 50% of the health problems caused by air pollution.

The most important reason for concern over the worsening air pollution in the country is its effect on the health of individuals. Exposure to particulate matter for a long time can lead to respiratory and cardiovascular diseases such as asthma, bronchitis, COPD, lung cancer and heart attack. The Global Burden of Disease Study for 2010, published in 2013, had found that outdoor air pollution was the fifth-largest killer in India and around 620,000 early deaths occurred from air pollution-related diseases in 2010. According to a WHO study, 13 of the 20 most-polluted cities in the world are in India; however, the accuracy and methodology of the WHO study was questioned by the Government of India. India also has one of the highest number of COPD patients and the highest number of deaths due to COPD.

Over a million Indians die prematurely every year due to air pollution, according to the non-profit Health Effects Institute. Over two million children—half the children in Delhi—have abnormalities in their lung function, according to the Delhi Heart and Lung Institute. Over the past decade air pollution has increased in India significantly. Asthma is the most common health problem faced by Indians and it accounts for more than half of the health issues caused by air pollution. Air pollution is believed to be one of the key factors in accelerating the onset of Alzheimer's disease in India.

The Global Burden of Disease Study of 2017 analysed in a report by The Lancet indicated that 76.8% of Indians are exposed to higher ambient particulate matter over 40 μg/m^{3}, which is significantly above the national limit recommended by national guidelines on ambient air pollution. The study estimated that of 480.7 million Disability-Adjusted Life Years in India 4.4% of could be ascribed to ambient particulate matter pollution and 15.8 million of them were the result of polluted air in households. In terms of average life expectancy it is suggested that average life expectancy in India would increase by 1.7 years if exposure was limited to national minimum recommendations.

Ambient air pollution in India is estimated to cause 670,000 deaths annually and particularly aggravates respiratory and cardiovascular conditions including chronic bronchitis, lung cancer and asthma. Ambient air pollution is linked to an increase in hospital visits, with a higher concentration of outdoor pollution particulates resulting in emergency room visit increases of between 20 and 25% for a range of conditions associated with higher exposure to air pollution. Approximately 76% of households in rural India are reliant on solid biomass for cooking purposes which contributes further to the disease burden of ambient air pollution experienced by the population of India.

=== State-Wide Trends ===
According to the WHO, India has 14 out of the 15 most polluted cities in the world in terms of PM 2.5 concentrations. Other Indian cities that registered very high levels of PM2.5 pollutants are Delhi, Patna, Agra, Muzaffarpur, Srinagar, Gurgaon, Jaipur, Patiala and Jodhpur, followed by Ali Subah Al-Salem in Kuwait and a few cities in China and Mongolia.

Air Quality Index (AQI) is a number used to communicate the level of pollution in the air and it essentially tells you the level of pollution in the air in a given city on a given day. The AQI of Delhi was placed under the "severe-plus category" when it touched 574, by the System of Air Quality and Weather Forecasting And Research. In May 2014 the World Health Organization announced New Delhi as the most polluted city in the world. In November 2016, the Great smog of Delhi was an environmental event which saw New Delhi and adjoining areas in a dense blanket of smog, which was the worst in 17 years.

2018 Air Pollution in New Delhi (PM2.5 AQI). A surge on June 14 was caused by dust storms brought on by a combination of extreme heat and powerful downdraft winds. Hazardous Very Unhealthy Unhealthy Unhealthy for Sensitive Groups Moderate Good

Top 13 Cities in India with the highest level of PM 2.5
Cities	PM2.5 Levels
Delhi	153
Patna	149
Gwalior	144
Raipur	134
Ahmedabad	100
Lucknow	96
Firozabad	96
Kanpur	93
Amritsar	92
Ludhiana	91
Prayagraj	88
Agra	88
Khanna	88

India's Central Pollution Control Board now routinely monitors four air pollutants namely sulphur dioxide (SO2), oxides of nitrogen (NOx), suspended particulate matter (SPM) and respirable particulate matter (PM10). These are target air pollutants for regular monitoring at 308 operating stations in 115 cities/towns in 25 states and 4 Union Territories of India. The monitoring of meteorological parameters such as wind speed and direction, relative humidity and temperature has also been integrated with the monitoring of air quality. The monitoring of these pollutants is carried out for 24 hours (4-hourly sampling for gaseous pollutants and 8-hourly sampling for particulate matter) with a frequency of twice a week, to yield 104 observations in a year.

The key findings of India's central pollution control board are:

- Most Indian cities continue to violate India's and world air quality PM10 targets. Respirable particulate matter pollution remains a key challenge for India. Despite the general non-attainment, some cities showed far more improvement than others. A decreasing trend has been observed in PM10 levels in cities like Solapur and Ahmedabad over the last few years. This improvement may be due to local measures taken to reduce Sulphur in diesel and stringent enforcement by the government.
- A decreasing trend has been observed in Sulphur dioxide levels in residential areas of many cities such as Delhi, Mumbai, Lucknow, Bhopal during last few years. The decreasing trend in Sulphur dioxide levels may be due to recently introduced clean fuel standards, and the increasing use of LPG as domestic fuel instead of coal or fuelwood, and the use of CNG instead of diesel in certain vehicles.
- A decreasing trend has been observed in nitrogen dioxide levels in residential areas of some cities such as Bhopal and Solapur during last few years.
- Most Indian cities greatly exceed acceptable levels of suspended particulate matter. This may be because of refuse and biomass burning, vehicles, power plant emissions, industrial sources.
- The Indian air quality monitoring stations reported lower levels of PM10 and suspended particulate matter during monsoon months possibly due to wet deposition and air scrubbing by rainfall. Higher levels of particulates were observed during winter months possibly due to lower mixing heights and more calm conditions. In other words, India's air quality worsens in winter months, and improves with the onset of monsoon season.
- The average annual SOx and NOx emissions level and periodic violations in industrial areas of India were significantly and surprisingly lower than the emission and violations in residential areas of India
- Of the four major Indian cities, air pollution was consistently worse in Delhi, every year over 5-year period (2004–2018). Kolkata was a close second, followed by Mumbai. Chennai air pollution was least of the four.

== Major events ==
=== 2024 Indo-Pakistani smog ===
Pollution in Delhi reached drastic levels following Diwali celebrations, when illegal firecracker use temporarily pushed the city's pollution levels above Lahore's during the morning of 8 November. The air quality index of New Delhi (capital of India) dropped into the severe category in November 2024 according to SAFAR, India's main environmental agency. On November 18, "Swiss group IQAir ranks New Delhi as the world's most polluted city with air quality at a 'hazardous' 1,081." Government has ordered schools to close and construction to cease to tackle the issue. The reading of the city dropped to 489 in the next day (November 19), although it was still the most polluted in the world.

=== 2026 north India stubble burning ===
Independent satellite evaluations of agricultural stubble burning in northern India during the 2026 post-monsoon harvest season revealed notable differences with official government totals. Hiren Jethva, a scientist at Morgan State University and NASA Goddard Space Flight Center, estimated that approximately 34,000 fires occurred throughout Punjab and Haryana between October 1 and November 9, despite the Commission for Air Quality Management (CAQM) recording 4,459 incidents in Punjab through 8 November.

The difference was explained by farmers moving their burning times to the late afternoon, which prevented polar-orbiting sensors like NOAA-20's VIIRS and Aqua's MODIS from using their customary early-afternoon overpass windows. In order to arrive at the estimate, Jethva empirically adjusted late-afternoon Aqua MODIS detections to the 375-meter VIIRS baseline. Similarly, geostationary ISRO INSAT-3DS observations showed that 98% of seasonal fire detections took place between 4:00 and 6:00 p.m.

== Steps taken ==
- The government in Delhi launched an Odd-Even Rule in November 2017 which is based on the Odd-Even rationing method: This meant that cars running with number plates ending in Odd digits could only be driven on certain days of the week, while the Even digit cars could be driven on the remaining days of the week.
- Local governments of various states also implemented measures such as tighter vehicle emissions' norms, higher penalties for burning rubbish and better control of road dust.
- The Indian government has committed to a 50% reduction in households using solid fuel for cooking
- Some goals set for future are:
  - Clean up the transportation sector by introducing 1,000 electric public transport buses to its existing 550 buses.
  - Upgrade all fossil fuel combustion engine vehicles to BS6 emission standards
  - Meet a goal of 25% of private vehicles to be electricity powered by 2023
  - Renewable energy in all power plants
  - Provide farmers with a machine called a Happy Seeder which converts agricultural residue to fertilizer
  - Encourage crop diversification to farmers and grow sustainable water-conserving crops such as coarse grains and pulses.
  - Analyze health data and study the efficiency of different room filtration systems in areas where indoor air pollution is highest.
  - Identify effective ways to inform the public about air pollution data
  - Launch new citizen science programs to better document exposures
  - Reduce Carbon Emissions: "According to Inter-governmental Panel on Climate Change, to limit warming well below 2 degree Celsius, CO2 emissions should decline by about 20 per cent by 2030 and reach net zero around 2075; to limit warming below 1.5 degree Celsius, CO2 emissions should decline by 50 per cent by 2030 and reach net zero by around 2050..."
  - Improve air quality monitoring by deploying more stations and utilizing IoT-based mobile and drive-by sensing approaches.

=== Graded Response Action Plan (GRAP) ===
The Supreme Court, in M. C. Mehta v. Union of India (2016) judgement approved implementation of Graded Response Action Plan (GRAP) for Delhi and Delhi NCR. Initially implemented by Environment Pollution (Prevention and Control) Authority, from 2021 onward it is currently being implemented by Commission for Air Quality Management in NCR & Adjoining Areas (CAQM). It is implemented in stages:

Graded Response Action Plan (GRAP)
Stage	AQI	Actions
Stage I (Poor)	~201-300 AQI: PM 2.5 - 61-120 μg/m3; PM 10 - 101-350 μg/m3	Halt unregistered construction on plots over 500sqm; Ban on waste burning; Pollution control measures in thermal power plants; Water sprinkling on roads and mechanized sweeping; Enforce PUC vehicle norms; Enforce SC guidelines on firecracker ban
Stage II (Very poor)	~300-400 AQI: PM 2.5 - 121-250 μg/m3; PM 10 - 351-430 μg/m3	Ban on use of diesel generators; Increased parking fees
Stage III (Severe)	~400-500 AQI: PM 2.5 - 250+ μg/m3; PM 10 - 430+ μg/m3	Closure of non-essential construction activities, including brick kilns, hot mix plants, etc.; Reduce operation of Coal based power plants and increase operation of natural gas power plants; Restrictions on BS III and BS IV vehicles
Stage IV (Very Severe)	>450 AQI: PM 2.5 - 300+ μg/m3; PM 10 - 500+ μg/m3	Emergency measures such as closure of schools and non-essential commercial activities; Implement even odd rule; Limit offices to 50% attendance; Ban non BS IV compliant vehicles and LCVs registered outside Delhi

=== Monitoring Stations ===
As per data from the Open Government Data platform, real time air quality is measured at the following stations.

State	City	Station	Agency
Andaman and Nicobar	Sri Vijaya Puram	Police Line, Sri Vijaya Puram	APPCC
Andhra Pradesh	Amaravati	Secretariat, Amaravati	APPCB
Andhra Pradesh	Anantapur	Gulzarpet, Anantapur	APPCB
Andhra Pradesh	Chittoor	Gangineni Cheruvu, Chittoor	APPCB
Andhra Pradesh	Kadapa	Yerramukkapalli, Kadapa	APPCB
Andhra Pradesh	Rajamahendravaram	Anand Kala Kshetram, Rajamahendravaram	APPCB
Andhra Pradesh	Tirumala	Toll Gate, Tirumala	APPCB
Andhra Pradesh	Tirupati	Vaikuntapuram, Tirupati	APPCB
Andhra Pradesh	Vijayawada	HB Colony, Vijayawada	APPCB
Andhra Pradesh	Vijayawada	Rajiv Gandhi Park, Vijayawada	APPCB
Andhra Pradesh	Vijayawada	Rajiv Nagar, Vijayawada	APPCB
Andhra Pradesh	Visakhapatnam	GVM Corporation, Visakhapatnam	APPCB
Arunachal Pradesh	Naharlagun	Naharlagun, Naharlagun	APSPCB
Assam	Byrnihat	Central Academy for SFS, Byrnihat	PCBA
Assam	Guwahati	IITG, Guwahati	PCBA
Assam	Guwahati	LGBI Airport, Guwahati	PCBA
Assam	Guwahati	Pan Bazaar, Guwahati	PCBA
Assam	Guwahati	Railway Colony, Guwahati	PCBA
Assam	Nagaon	Christianpatty, Nagaon	PCBA
Assam	Nalbari	Bata Chowk, Nalbari	PCBA
Assam	Silchar	Tarapur, Silchar	PCBA
Assam	Sivasagar	Girls College, Sivasagar	PCBA
Bihar	Araria	Kharahiya Basti, Araria	BSPCB
Bihar	Arrah	New DM Office, Arrah	BSPCB
Bihar	Aurangabad	Gurdeo Nagar, Aurangabad	BSPCB
Bihar	Begusarai	Lohiyanagar, Begusarai	BSPCB
Bihar	Bettiah	Kamalnath Nagar, Bettiah	BSPCB
Bihar	Bhagalpur	DM Office_Kachari Chowk, Bhagalpur	BSPCB
Bihar	Bhagalpur	Mayaganj, Bhagalpur	BSPCB
Bihar	Bihar Sharif	D M Colony, Bihar Sharif	BSPCB
Bihar	Buxar	Charitra Van, Buxar	BSPCB
Bihar	Chhapra	Darshan Nagar, Chhapra	BSPCB
Bihar	Gaya	Collectorate, Gaya	BSPCB
Bihar	Gaya	Kareemganj, Gaya	BSPCB
Bihar	Gaya	SFTI Kusdihra, Gaya	BSPCB
Bihar	Hajipur	Industrial Area, Hajipur	BSPCB
Bihar	Katihar	Mirchaibari, Katihar	BSPCB
Bihar	Kishanganj	SDM Office_Khagra, Kishanganj	BSPCB
Bihar	Manguraha	Forest Rest House, Manguraha	BSPCB
Bihar	Motihari	Gandak Colony, Motihari	BSPCB
Bihar	Munger	Town Hall, Munger	BSPCB
Bihar	Muzaffarpur	Buddha Colony, Muzaffarpur	BSPCB
Bihar	Muzaffarpur	MIT-Daudpur Kothi, Muzaffarpur	BSPCB
Bihar	Muzaffarpur	Muzaffarpur Collectorate, Muzaffarpur	BSPCB
Bihar	Patna	DRM Office Danapur, Patna	BSPCB
Bihar	Patna	Govt. High School Shikarpur, Patna	BSPCB
Bihar	Patna	IGSC Planetarium Complex, Patna	BSPCB
Bihar	Patna	Muradpur, Patna	BSPCB
Bihar	Patna	Rajbansi Nagar, Patna	BSPCB
Bihar	Purnia	Mariam Nagar, Purnia	BSPCB
Bihar	Rajgir	Dangi Tola, Rajgir	BSPCB
Bihar	Saharsa	Police Line, Saharsa	BSPCB
Bihar	Samastipur	DM Office_Kasipur, Samastipur	BSPCB
Bihar	Sasaram	Dada Peer, Sasaram	BSPCB
Bihar	Siwan	Chitragupta Nagar, Siwan	BSPCB
Chandigarh	Chandigarh	Sector 22, Chandigarh	CPCC
Chandigarh	Chandigarh	Sector-25, Chandigarh	CPCC
Chandigarh	Chandigarh	Sector-53, Chandigarh	CPCC
Chhattisgarh	Bhilai	32Bungalows, Bhilai	CECB
Chhattisgarh	Bhilai	Hathkhoj, Bhilai	CECB
Chhattisgarh	Bilaspur	Mangala, Bilaspur	NTPC
Chhattisgarh	Chhal	Nawapara SECL Colony, Chhal	CECB
Chhattisgarh	Korba	Rampur, Korba	CECB
Chhattisgarh	Korba	Urja Nagar, Korba	CECB
Chhattisgarh	Kunjemura	OP Jindal School, Kunjemura	CECB
Chhattisgarh	Milupara	Govt. Higher Secondary School, Milupara	CECB
Chhattisgarh	Raipur	AIIMS, Raipur	CECB
Chhattisgarh	Raipur	Bhatagaon New ISBT, Raipur	CECB
Chhattisgarh	Raipur	Krishak Nagar, Raipur	CECB
Chhattisgarh	Raipur	Siltara Phase-II, Raipur	CECB
Chhattisgarh	Tumidih	OP Jindal Industrial Park, Tumidih	CECB
Delhi	Delhi	Alipur, Delhi	DPCC
Delhi	Delhi	Anand Vihar, Delhi	DPCC
Delhi	Delhi	Ashok Vihar, Delhi	DPCC
Delhi	Delhi	Aya Nagar, Delhi	IMD
Delhi	Delhi	Bawana, Delhi	DPCC
Delhi	Delhi	Burari Crossing, Delhi	IMD
Delhi	Delhi	CRRI Mathura Road, Delhi	IMD
Delhi	Delhi	Chandni Chowk, Delhi	IITM
Delhi	Delhi	DTU, Delhi	CPCB
Delhi	Delhi	Dr. Karni Singh Shooting Range, Delhi	DPCC
Delhi	Delhi	Dwarka-Sector 8, Delhi	DPCC
Delhi	Delhi	IGI Airport, Delhi	T3
Delhi	Delhi	IHBAS, Dilshad Garden, Delhi	CPCB
Delhi	Delhi	ITO, Delhi	CPCB
Delhi	Delhi	Jahangirpuri, Delhi	DPCC
Delhi	Delhi	Jawaharlal Nehru Stadium, Delhi	DPCC
Delhi	Delhi	Lodhi Road, Delhi	IITM
Delhi	Delhi	Lodhi Road, Delhi	IMD
Delhi	Delhi	Major Dhyan Chand National Stadium, Delhi	DPCC
Delhi	Delhi	Mandir Marg, Delhi	DPCC
Delhi	Delhi	Mundka, Delhi	DPCC
Delhi	Delhi	NSIT Dwarka, Delhi	CPCB
Delhi	Delhi	Najafgarh, Delhi	DPCC
Delhi	Delhi	Narela, Delhi	DPCC
Delhi	Delhi	Nehru Nagar, Delhi	DPCC
Delhi	Delhi	North Campus, DU, Delhi	IMD
Delhi	Delhi	Okhla Phase-2, Delhi	DPCC
Delhi	Delhi	Patparganj, Delhi	DPCC
Delhi	Delhi	Punjabi Bagh, Delhi	DPCC
Delhi	Delhi	Pusa, Delhi	DPCC
Delhi	Delhi	Pusa, Delhi	IMD
Delhi	Delhi	R K Puram, Delhi	DPCC
Delhi	Delhi	Rohini, Delhi	DPCC
Delhi	Delhi	Shadipur, Delhi	CPCB
Delhi	Delhi	Sirifort, Delhi	CPCB
Delhi	Delhi	Sonia Vihar, Delhi	DPCC
Delhi	Delhi	Sri Aurobindo Marg, Delhi	DPCC
Delhi	Delhi	Vivek Vihar, Delhi	DPCC
Delhi	Delhi	Wazirpur, Delhi	DPCC
Gujarat	Ahmedabad	Chandkheda, Ahmedabad	IITM
Gujarat	Ahmedabad	Gyaspur, Ahmedabad	IITM
Gujarat	Ahmedabad	Maninagar, Ahmedabad	GPCB
Gujarat	Ahmedabad	Raikhad, Ahmedabad	IITM
Gujarat	Ahmedabad	Rakhial, Ahmedabad	IITM
Gujarat	Ahmedabad	SAC ISRO Bopal, Ahmedabad	IITM
Gujarat	Ahmedabad	SAC ISRO Satellite, Ahmedabad	IITM
Gujarat	Ahmedabad	SVPI Airport Hansol, Ahmedabad	IITM
Gujarat	Ankleshwar	GIDC, Ankleshwar	GPCB
Gujarat	Gandhinagar	GIFT City, Gandhinagar	IITM
Gujarat	Gandhinagar	IIPHG Lekawada, Gandhinagar	IITM
Gujarat	Gandhinagar	Sector-10, Gandhinagar	GPCB
Gujarat	Surat	Science Center, Surat	SMC
Gujarat	Vapi	Phase-1 GIDC, Vapi	GPCB
Gujarat	Vatva	Phase-4 GIDC, Vatva	GPCB
Haryana	Bahadurgarh	Arya Nagar, Bahadurgarh	HSPCB
Haryana	Bhiwani	H.B. Colony, Bhiwani	HSPCB
Haryana	Faridabad	New Industrial Town, Faridabad	HSPCB
Haryana	Faridabad	Sector 11, Faridabad	HSPCB
Haryana	Faridabad	Sector 30, Faridabad	HSPCB
Haryana	Gurugram	NISE Gwal Pahari, Gurugram	IMD
Haryana	Gurugram	Sector-51, Gurugram	HSPCB
Haryana	Kurukshetra	Sector-7, Kurukshetra	HSPCB
Haryana	Manesar	Sector-2 IMT, Manesar	HSPCB
Haryana	Narnaul	Shastri Nagar, Narnaul	HSPCB
Haryana	Palwal	Shyam Nagar, Palwal	HSPCB
Haryana	Panchgaon	Amity University, Panchgaon	IITM
Haryana	Panipat	Sector-18, Panipat	HSPCB
Haryana	Rohtak	MD University, Rohtak	HSPCB
Haryana	Sirsa	F-Block, Sirsa	HSPCB
Himachal Pradesh	Baddi	HIMUDA Complex Phase-1, Baddi	HPPCB
Jammu_and_Kashmir	Srinagar	Rajbagh, Srinagar	JKSPCB
Jharkhand	Dhanbad	Sardar Patel Nagar, Dhanbad	JSPCB
Jharkhand	Jorapokhar	Tata Stadium, Jorapokhar	JSPCB
Karnataka	Bagalkot	Vidayagiri, Bagalkot	KSPCB
Karnataka	Bengaluru	Bapuji Nagar, Bengaluru	KSPCB
Karnataka	Bengaluru	City Railway Station, Bengaluru	KSPCB
Karnataka	Bengaluru	Hebbal, Bengaluru	KSPCB
Karnataka	Bengaluru	Hombegowda Nagar, Bengaluru	KSPCB
Karnataka	Bengaluru	Jayanagar 5th Block, Bengaluru	KSPCB
Karnataka	Bengaluru	Sanegurava Halli, Bengaluru	KSPCB
Karnataka	Bengaluru	Shivapura_Peenya, Bengaluru	KSPCB
Karnataka	Bengaluru	Silk Board, Bengaluru	KSPCB
Karnataka	Chamarajanagar	Urban, Chamarajanagar	KSPCB
Karnataka	Chikkamagaluru	Kalyana Nagara, Chikkamagaluru	KSPCB
Karnataka	Davanagere	Devaraj Urs Badavane, Davanagere	KSPCB
Karnataka	Dharwad	Kalabhavan, Dharwad	KSPCB
Karnataka	Haveri	Ashwini Nagar, Haveri	KSPCB
Karnataka	Hubballi	Lingaraj Nagar, Hubballi	KSPCB
Karnataka	Kalaburagi	Mahatma Basaveswar Colony, Kalaburgi	KSPCB
Karnataka	Karwar	KHB Colony, Karwar	KSPCB
Karnataka	Koppal	Diwator Nagar, Koppal	KSPCB
Karnataka	Madikeri	Stuart Hill, Madikeri	KSPCB
Karnataka	Mysuru	Hebbal 1st Stage, Mysuru	KSPCB
Karnataka	Ramanagara	Vijay Nagar, Ramanagara	KSPCB
Karnataka	Shivamogga	Vinoba Nagara, Shivamogga	KSPCB
Karnataka	Vijayapura	Ibrahimpur, Vijayapura	KSPCB
Karnataka	Yadgir	Collector Office, Yadgir	KSPCB
Kerala	Eloor	Udyogamandal, Eloor - Kerala	PCB
Kerala	Kannur	Thavakkara, Kannur - Kerala	PCB
Kerala	Kollam	Polayathode, Kollam - Kerala	PCB
Kerala	Thiruvananthapuram	Kariavattom, Thiruvananthapuram - Kerala	PCB
Kerala	Thiruvananthapuram	Plammoodu, Thiruvananthapuram - Kerala	PCB
Kerala	Thrissur	Corporation Ground, Thrissur - Kerala	PCB
Madhya Pradesh	Bhopal	Idgah Hills, Bhopal	MPPCB
Madhya Pradesh	Bhopal	Paryavaran Parisar, Bhopal	MPPCB
Madhya Pradesh	Bhopal	T T Nagar, Bhopal	MPPCB
Madhya Pradesh	Damoh	Shrivastav Colony, Damoh	MPPCB
Madhya Pradesh	Dewas	Bhopal Chauraha, Dewas	MPPCB
Madhya Pradesh	Gwalior	City Center, Gwalior	MPPCB
Madhya Pradesh	Gwalior	Deen Dayal Nagar, Gwalior	MPPCB
Madhya Pradesh	Gwalior	Maharaj Bada, Gwalior	MPPCB
Madhya Pradesh	Indore	Chhoti Gwaltoli, Indore	MPPCB
Madhya Pradesh	Indore	Maguda Nagar, Indore	IMC
Madhya Pradesh	Indore	Regional Park, Indore	IMC
Madhya Pradesh	Indore	Residency Area, Indore	IMC
Madhya Pradesh	Jabalpur	Govindh Bhavan Colony, Jabalpur	JMC
Madhya Pradesh	Jabalpur	Gupteshwar, Jabalpur	JMC
Madhya Pradesh	Jabalpur	Marhatal, Jabalpur	MPPCB
Madhya Pradesh	Jabalpur	Suhagi, Jabalpur	JMC
Madhya Pradesh	Katni	Gole Bazar, Katni	MPPCB
Madhya Pradesh	Maihar	Sahilara, Maihar - KJS Cements	
Madhya Pradesh	Mandideep	Sector-D Industrial Area, Mandideep	MPPCB
Madhya Pradesh	Pithampur	Sector-2 Industrial Area, Pithampur	MPPCB
Madhya Pradesh	Ratlam	Shasthri Nagar, Ratlam - IPCA Lab	
Madhya Pradesh	Sagar	Civil Lines, Sagar	MPPCB
Madhya Pradesh	Satna	Bandhavgar Colony, Satna - Birla Cement	
Maharashtra	Ahmednagar	Tarakpur, Ahmednagar	MPCB
Maharashtra	Akola	Ramdaspeth, Akola	MPCB
Maharashtra	Amravati	Shivneri Colony, Amravati	MPCB
Maharashtra	Amravati	Shri Shivaji Science College, Amravati	MPCB
Maharashtra	Aurangabad	MIDC Chilkalthana, Aurangabad	MPCB
Maharashtra	Aurangabad	More Chowk Waluj, Aurangabad	MPCB
Maharashtra	Aurangabad	Rachnakar Colony, Aurangabad	MPCB
Maharashtra	Badlapur	Katrap, Badlapur	MPCB
Maharashtra	Belapur	CBD Belapur, Belapur	MPCB
Maharashtra	Bhiwandi	Gokul Nagar, Bhiwandi	MPCB
Maharashtra	Boisar	Khaira, Boisar	MPCB
Maharashtra	Chandrapur	Chauhan Colony, Chandrapur	MPCB
Maharashtra	Chandrapur	MIDC Khutala, Chandrapur	MPCB
Maharashtra	Dhule	Deopur, Dhule	MPCB
Maharashtra	Jalgaon	Prabhat Colony, Jalgaon	MPCB
Maharashtra	Jalna	Old MIDC, Jalna	MPCB
Maharashtra	Kalyan	Khadakpada, Kalyan	MPCB
Maharashtra	Kolhapur	Shivaji University, Kolhapur	MPCB
Maharashtra	Kolhapur	Sinchan Bhavan, Kolhapur	MPCB
Maharashtra	Latur	Sawe Wadi, Latur	MPCB
Maharashtra	Mahad	Kamble Tarf Birwadi, Mahad	MPCB
Maharashtra	Malegaon	Mahesh Nagar, Malegaon	MPCB
Maharashtra	Mira-Bhayandar	Bhayandar West, Mira-Bhayandar	MPCB
Maharashtra	Mumbai	Bandra Kurla Complex, Mumbai	IITM
Maharashtra	Mumbai	Bandra Kurla Complex, Mumbai	MPCB
Maharashtra	Mumbai	Borivali East, Mumbai	IITM
Maharashtra	Mumbai	Borivali East, Mumbai	MPCB
Maharashtra	Mumbai	Byculla, Mumbai	BMC
Maharashtra	Mumbai	Chakala-Andheri East, Mumbai	MPCB
Maharashtra	Mumbai	Chembur, Mumbai	MPCB
Maharashtra	Mumbai	Chhatrapati Shivaji Intl. Airport, Mumbai	MPCB
Maharashtra	Mumbai	Colaba, Mumbai	MPCB
Maharashtra	Mumbai	Deonar, Mumbai	IITM
Maharashtra	Mumbai	Ghatkopar, Mumbai	BMC
Maharashtra	Mumbai	Kandivali West, Mumbai	BMC
Maharashtra	Mumbai	Kherwadi_Bandra East, Mumbai	MPCB
Maharashtra	Mumbai	Khindipada-Bhandup West, Mumbai	IITM
Maharashtra	Mumbai	Kurla, Mumbai	MPCB
Maharashtra	Mumbai	Malad West, Mumbai	IITM
Maharashtra	Mumbai	Mazgaon, Mumbai	IITM
Maharashtra	Mumbai	Mindspace-Malad West, Mumbai	MPCB
Maharashtra	Mumbai	Navy Nagar-Colaba, Mumbai	IITM
Maharashtra	Mumbai	Powai, Mumbai	MPCB
Maharashtra	Mumbai	Sewri, Mumbai	BMC
Maharashtra	Mumbai	Shivaji Nagar, Mumbai	BMC
Maharashtra	Mumbai	Siddharth Nagar-Worli, Mumbai	IITM
Maharashtra	Mumbai	Sion, Mumbai	MPCB
Maharashtra	Mumbai	Vasai West, Mumbai	MPCB
Maharashtra	Mumbai	Vile Parle West, Mumbai	MPCB
Maharashtra	Mumbai	Worli, Mumbai	MPCB
Maharashtra	Nagpur	Ambazari, Nagpur	MPCB
Maharashtra	Nagpur	Mahal, Nagpur	MPCB
Maharashtra	Nagpur	Opp GPO Civil Lines, Nagpur	MPCB
Maharashtra	Nagpur	Ram Nagar, Nagpur	MPCB
Maharashtra	Nanded	Sneh Nagar, Nanded	MPCB
Maharashtra	Nashik	Gangapur Road, Nashik	MPCB
Maharashtra	Nashik	Hirawadi, Nashik	MPCB
Maharashtra	Nashik	MIDC Ambad, Nashik	MPCB
Maharashtra	Nashik	Pandav Nagari, Nashik	MPCB
Maharashtra	Navi Mumbai	Kopripada-Vashi, Navi Mumbai	MPCB
Maharashtra	Navi Mumbai	Mahape, Navi Mumbai	MPCB
Maharashtra	Navi Mumbai	Nerul, Navi Mumbai	MPCB
Maharashtra	Navi Mumbai	Sanpada, Navi Mumbai	MPCB
Maharashtra	Navi Mumbai	Sector-2E Kalamboli, Navi Mumbai	MPCB
Maharashtra	Navi Mumbai	Tondare-Taloja, Navi Mumbai	MPCB
Maharashtra	Parbhani	Masoom Colony, Parbhani	MPCB
Maharashtra	Pimpri-Chinchwad	Gavalinagar, Pimpri Chinchwad	MPCB
Maharashtra	Pimpri-Chinchwad	Park Street Wakad, Pimpri Chinchwad	MPCB
Maharashtra	Pimpri-Chinchwad	Savta Mali Nagar, Pimpri-Chinchwad	IITM
Maharashtra	Pimpri-Chinchwad	Thergaon, Pimpri Chinchwad	MPCB
Maharashtra	Pune	Bhumkar Nagar, Pune	IITM
Maharashtra	Pune	Katraj Dairy, Pune	MPCB
Maharashtra	Pune	Mhada Colony, Pune	IITM
Maharashtra	Pune	Panchawati_Pashan, Pune	IITM
Maharashtra	Pune	Revenue Colony-Shivajinagar, Pune	IITM
Maharashtra	Pune	Savitribai Phule Pune University, Pune	MPCB
Maharashtra	Pune	Transport Nagar-Nigdi, Pune	IITM
Maharashtra	Sangli	Vijay Nagar, Sangli	MPCB
Maharashtra	Solapur	Dnyaneshwar Nagar, Solapur	MPCB
Maharashtra	Solapur	Ratandeep Housing Society, Solapur	MPCB
Maharashtra	Thane	Kasarvadavali, Thane	MPCB
Maharashtra	Thane	Upvan Fort, Thane	MPCB
Maharashtra	Ulhasnagar	Sidhi Vinayak Nagar, Ulhasnagar	MPCB
Maharashtra	Virar	Bolinj, Virar	MPCB
Meghalaya	Shillong	JN Stadium, Shillong - Meghalaya	PCB
Meghalaya	Shillong	Lumpyngngad, Shillong - Meghalaya	PCB
Nagaland	Kohima	PWD Junction, Kohima	NPCB
Odisha	Angul	Hakimapada, Angul	OSPCB
Odisha	Balasore	Kalidaspur, Balasore	OSPCB
Odisha	Barbil	Forest Office, Barbil	OSPCB
Odisha	Baripada	Meher Colony, Baripada	OSPCB
Odisha	Bhubaneswar	Lingraj Mandir, Bhubaneswar	OSPCB
Odisha	Bhubaneswar	Patia, Bhubaneswar	OSPCB
Odisha	Bileipada	Tata Township, Bileipada	OSPCB
Odisha	Brajrajnagar	GM Office, Brajrajnagar	OSPCB
Odisha	Byasanagar	Ferro Chrome Colony, Byasanagar	OSPCB
Odisha	Cuttack	CDA Area, Cuttack	OSPCB
Odisha	Nayagarh	Dabuna, Nayagarh	OSPCB
Odisha	Rourkela	Fertilizer Township, Rourkela	OSPCB
Odisha	Rourkela	Raghunathpali, Rourkela	OSPCB
Odisha	Talcher	Talcher Coalfields,Talcher	OSPCB
Punjab	Amritsar	Golden Temple, Amritsar	PPCB
Punjab	Bathinda	Hardev Nagar, Bathinda	PPCB
Punjab	Jalandhar	Civil Line, Jalandhar	PPCB
Punjab	Khanna	Kalal Majra, Khanna	PPCB
Punjab	Ludhiana	Punjab Agricultural University, Ludhiana	PPCB
Punjab	Mandi Gobindgarh	RIMT University, Mandi Gobindgarh	PPCB
Punjab	Patiala	Model Town, Patiala	PPCB
Punjab	Rupnagar	Ratanpura, Rupnagar	Ambuja Cements
Rajasthan	Ajmer	Civil Lines, Ajmer	RSPCB
Rajasthan	Alwar	Moti Doongri, Alwar	RSPCB
Rajasthan	Banswara	Rati Talai, Banswara	RSPCB
Rajasthan	Baran	Bamboliya, Baran	RSPCB
Rajasthan	Barmer	Railway Colony, Barmer	RSPCB
Rajasthan	Bharatpur	Krishna Nagar, Bharatpur	RSPCB
Rajasthan	Bhilwara	Pratap Nagar, Bhilwara	RSPCB
Rajasthan	Bhiwadi	RIICO Ind. Area III, Bhiwadi	RSPCB
Rajasthan	Bhiwadi	Vasundhara Nagar_UIT, Bhiwadi	RSPCB
Rajasthan	Bikaner	MM Ground, Bikaner	RSPCB
Rajasthan	Bundi	New Colony, Bundi	RSPCB
Rajasthan	Chittorgarh	Shastri Nagar, Chittorgarh	RSPCB
Rajasthan	Churu	Subash Chowk, Churu	RSPCB
Rajasthan	Dausa	Khatikan Mohalla, Dausa	RSPCB
Rajasthan	Dungarpur	Bhoiwada, Dungarpur	RSPCB
Rajasthan	Hanumangarh	Housing Board, Hanumangarh	RSPCB
Rajasthan	Jaipur	Adarsh Nagar, Jaipur	RSPCB
Rajasthan	Jaipur	Mansarovar Sector-12, Jaipur	RSPCB
Rajasthan	Jaipur	Police Commissionerate, Jaipur	RSPCB
Rajasthan	Jaipur	RIICO Sitapura, Jaipur	RSPCB
Rajasthan	Jaipur	Sector-2 Murlipura, Jaipur	RSPCB
Rajasthan	Jaipur	Shastri Nagar, Jaipur	RSPCB
Rajasthan	Jaisalmer	Sadar Bazar, Jaisalmer	RSPCB
Rajasthan	Jalore	Mudtra Sili, Jalore	RSPCB
Rajasthan	Jhalawar	Rajlaxmi Nagar, Jhalawar	RSPCB
Rajasthan	Jhunjhunu	Indra Nagar, Jhunjhunu	RSPCB
Rajasthan	Jodhpur	Collectorate, Jodhpur	RSPCB
Rajasthan	Jodhpur	Digari Kalan, Jodhpur	RSPCB
Rajasthan	Jodhpur	Jhalamand, Jodhpur	RSPCB
Rajasthan	Jodhpur	Mandor, Jodhpur	RSPCB
Rajasthan	Jodhpur	Samrat Ashok Udhyan, Jodhpur	RSPCB
Rajasthan	Karauli	Satyawati Vihar, Karauli	RSPCB
Rajasthan	Kota	Dhanmandi, Kota	RSPCB
Rajasthan	Kota	Nayapura, Kota	RSPCB
Rajasthan	Kota	Shrinath Puram, Kota	RSPCB
Rajasthan	Nagaur	Karni Colony, Nagaur	RSPCB
Rajasthan	Pali	Indira Colony Vistar, Pali	RSPCB
Rajasthan	Pratapgarh	Pragati Nagar, Pratapgarh	RSPCB
Rajasthan	Rajsamand	Dhoinda, Rajsamand	RSPCB
Rajasthan	Sawai Madhopur	Sahu Nagar, Sawai Madhopur	RSPCB
Rajasthan	Sikar	Radhakishan Pura, Sikar	RSPCB
Rajasthan	Sirohi	Vedhaynath Colony, Sirohi	RSPCB
Rajasthan	Sri Ganganagar	Old City, Sri Ganganagar	RSPCB
Rajasthan	Tonk	Shastri Nagar, Tonk	RSPCB
Rajasthan	Udaipur	Ashok Nagar, Udaipur	RSPCB
Sikkim	Gangtok	Zero Point GICI, Gangtok	SSPCB
Tamil Nadu	Ariyalur	Keelapalur, Ariyalur	TNPCB
Tamil Nadu	Chengalpattu	Crescent University, Chengalpattu	TNPCB
Tamil Nadu	Chennai	Alandur Bus Depot, Chennai	CPCB
Tamil Nadu	Chennai	Arumbakkam, Chennai	TNPCB
Tamil Nadu	Chennai	Kodungaiyur, Chennai	TNPCB
Tamil Nadu	Chennai	Manali Village, Chennai	TNPCB
Tamil Nadu	Chennai	Manali, Chennai	CPCB
Tamil Nadu	Chennai	Perungudi, Chennai	TNPCB
Tamil Nadu	Chennai	Royapuram, Chennai	TNPCB
Tamil Nadu	Chennai	Velachery Res. Area, Chennai	CPCB
Tamil Nadu	Coimbatore	PSG College of Arts and Science, Coimbatore	TNPCB
Tamil Nadu	Coimbatore	SIDCO Kurichi, Coimbatore	TNPCB
Tamil Nadu	Cuddalore	Kudikadu, Cuddalore	TNPCB
Tamil Nadu	Cuddalore	Semmandalam, Cuddalore	TNPCB
Tamil Nadu	Dindigul	Mendonsa Colony, Dindigul	TNPCB
Tamil Nadu	Gummidipoondi	Anthoni Pillai Nagar, Gummidipoondi	TNPCB
Tamil Nadu	Hosur	SIPCOT Phase-1, Hosur	TNPCB
Tamil Nadu	Kanchipuram	Kilambi, Kanchipuram	TNPCB
Tamil Nadu	Karur	Kamadenu Nagar, Karur	TNPCB
Tamil Nadu	Madurai	Uchapatti, Madurai	TNPCB
Tamil Nadu	Nagapattinam	Velippalayam, Nagapattinam	TNPCB
Tamil Nadu	Namakkal	Ponnusamy Nagar, Namakkal	TNPCB
Tamil Nadu	Ooty	Bombay Castel, Ooty	TNPCB
Tamil Nadu	Palkalaiperur	Bharathidasan University, Palkalaiperur	TNPCB
Tamil Nadu	Perundurai	SIPCOT Industrial Park, Perundurai	TNPCB
Tamil Nadu	Pudukottai	SIPCOT Nathampannai, Pudukottai	TNPCB
Tamil Nadu	Ramanathapuram	Chalai Bazaar, Ramanathapuram	TNPCB
Tamil Nadu	Ranipet	VOC Nagar_SIPCOT, Ranipet	TNPCB
Tamil Nadu	Salem	Sona College of Technology, Salem	TNPCB
Tamil Nadu	Thanjavur	Parisutham Nagar, Thanjavur	TNPCB
Tamil Nadu	Thoothukudi	Meelavittan, Thoothukudi	TNPCB
Tamil Nadu	Tiruchirappalli	St Joseph College, Tiruchirappalli	TNPCB
Tamil Nadu	Tirunelveli	Municipal Corporation Office, Tirunelveli	TNPCB
Tamil Nadu	Tirupur	Kumaran College, Tirupur	TNPCB
Tamil Nadu	Vellore	Vasanthapuram, Vellore	TNPCB
Tamil Nadu	Virudhunagar	Collectorate Office, Virudhunagar	TNPCB
Telangana	Hyderabad	Bollaram Industrial Area, Hyderabad	TSPCB
Telangana	Hyderabad	Central University, Hyderabad	TSPCB
Telangana	Hyderabad	ECIL Kapra, Hyderabad	TSPCB
Telangana	Hyderabad	ICRISAT Patancheru, Hyderabad	TSPCB
Telangana	Hyderabad	IDA Pashamylaram, Hyderabad	TSPCB
Telangana	Hyderabad	Kokapet, Hyderabad	TSPCB
Telangana	Hyderabad	Kompally Municipal Office, Hyderabad	TSPCB
Telangana	Hyderabad	Nacharam_TSIIC IALA, Hyderabad	TSPCB
Telangana	Hyderabad	New Malakpet, Hyderabad	TSPCB
Telangana	Hyderabad	Ramachandrapuram, Hyderabad	TSPCB
Telangana	Hyderabad	Sanathnagar, Hyderabad	TSPCB
Telangana	Hyderabad	Somajiguda, Hyderabad	TSPCB
Telangana	Hyderabad	Zoo Park, Hyderabad	TSPCB
Tripura	Agartala	Bardowali, Agartala - Tripura	SPCB
Uttar Pradesh	Agra	Manoharpur, Agra	UPPCB
Uttar Pradesh	Agra	Rohta, Agra	UPPCB
Uttar Pradesh	Agra	Sanjay Palace, Agra	UPPCB
Uttar Pradesh	Agra	Sector-3B Avas Vikas Colony, Agra	UPPCB
Uttar Pradesh	Agra	Shahjahan Garden, Agra	UPPCB
Uttar Pradesh	Agra	Shastripuram, Agra	UPPCB
Uttar Pradesh	Baghpat	Sardar Patel Inter College, Baghpat	UPPCB
Uttar Pradesh	Bareilly	Civil Lines, Bareilly	UPPCB
Uttar Pradesh	Bareilly	Rajendra Nagar, Bareilly	UPPCB
Uttar Pradesh	Bulandshahr	Yamunapuram, Bulandshahr	UPPCB
Uttar Pradesh	Firozabad	Nagla Bhau, Firozabad	UPPCB
Uttar Pradesh	Firozabad	Vibhab Nagar, Firozabad	UPPCB
Uttar Pradesh	Ghaziabad	Loni, Ghaziabad	UPPCB
Uttar Pradesh	Ghaziabad	Sanjay Nagar, Ghaziabad	UPPCB
Uttar Pradesh	Ghaziabad	Vasundhara, Ghaziabad	UPPCB
Uttar Pradesh	Gorakhpur	Madan Mohan Malaviya University of Technology, Gorakhpur	UPPCB
Uttar Pradesh	Greater Noida	Knowledge Park - III, Greater Noida	UPPCB
Uttar Pradesh	Greater Noida	Knowledge Park - V, Greater Noida	UPPCB
Uttar Pradesh	Hapur	Anand Vihar, Hapur	UPPCB
Uttar Pradesh	Jhansi	Shivaji Nagar, Jhansi	UPPCB
Uttar Pradesh	Kanpur	FTI Kidwai Nagar, Kanpur	UPPCB
Uttar Pradesh	Kanpur	NSI Kalyanpur, Kanpur	UPPCB
Uttar Pradesh	Kanpur	Nehru Nagar, Kanpur	UPPCB
Uttar Pradesh	Khurja	Kalindi Kunj, Khurja	UPPCB
Uttar Pradesh	Lucknow	B R Ambedkar University, Lucknow	UPPCB
Uttar Pradesh	Lucknow	Gomti Nagar, Lucknow	UPPCB
Uttar Pradesh	Lucknow	Kendriya Vidyalaya, Lucknow	CPCB
Uttar Pradesh	Lucknow	Kukrail Picnic Spot-1, Lucknow	UPPCB
Uttar Pradesh	Lucknow	Lalbagh, Lucknow	CPCB
Uttar Pradesh	Lucknow	Talkatora District Industries Center, Lucknow	CPCB
Uttar Pradesh	Meerut	Ganga Nagar, Meerut	UPPCB
Uttar Pradesh	Meerut	Jai Bhim Nagar, Meerut	UPPCB
Uttar Pradesh	Meerut	Pallavpuram Phase 2, Meerut	UPPCB
Uttar Pradesh	Moradabad	Buddhi Vihar, Moradabad	UPPCB
Uttar Pradesh	Moradabad	Eco Herbal Park, Moradabad	UPPCB
Uttar Pradesh	Moradabad	Employment Office, Moradabad	UPPCB
Uttar Pradesh	Moradabad	Jigar Colony, Moradabad	UPPCB
Uttar Pradesh	Moradabad	Kashiram Nagar, Moradabad	UPPCB
Uttar Pradesh	Moradabad	Transport Nagar, Moradabad	UPPCB
Uttar Pradesh	Muzaffarnagar	New Mandi, Muzaffarnagar	UPPCB
Uttar Pradesh	Noida	Sector - 125, Noida	UPPCB
Uttar Pradesh	Noida	Sector - 62, Noida	IMD
Uttar Pradesh	Noida	Sector-1, Noida	UPPCB
Uttar Pradesh	Noida	Sector-116, Noida	UPPCB
Uttar Pradesh	Prayagraj	Jhunsi, Prayagraj	UPPCB
Uttar Pradesh	Prayagraj	Motilal Nehru NIT, Prayagraj	UPPCB
Uttar Pradesh	Prayagraj	Nagar Nigam, Prayagraj	UPPCB
Uttar Pradesh	Varanasi	Ardhali Bazar, Varanasi	UPPCB
Uttar Pradesh	Varanasi	Bhelupur, Varanasi	UPPCB
Uttar Pradesh	Varanasi	IESD Banaras Hindu University, Varanasi	UPPCB
Uttar Pradesh	Varanasi	Maldahiya, Varanasi	UPPCB
Uttar Pradesh	Vrindavan	Omex Eternity, Vrindavan	UPPCB
Uttarakhand	Dehradun	Doon University, Dehradun	UKPCB
Uttarakhand	Kashipur	Govt. Girls Inter College, Kashipur	UKPCB
Uttarakhand	Rishikesh	Shivaji Nagar, Rishikesh	UKPCB
West Bengal	Asansol	Asansol Court Area, Asansol	WBPCB
West Bengal	Asansol	Evelyn Lodge, Asansol	WBPCB
West Bengal	Asansol	Mahabir Colliery, Asansol	WBPCB
West Bengal	Asansol	Trivenidevi Bhalotia College, Asansol	WBPCB
West Bengal	Barrackpore	SVSPA Campus, Barrackpore	WBPCB
West Bengal	Durgapur	PCBL Residential Complex, Durgapur	WBPCB
West Bengal	Durgapur	Women's College City Center, Durgapur	WBPCB
West Bengal	Haldia	Priyambada Housing Estate, Haldia	WBPCB
West Bengal	Howrah	Belur Math, Howrah	WBPCB
West Bengal	Howrah	Botanical Garden, Howrah	WBPCB
West Bengal	Howrah	Dasnagar, Howrah	WBPCB
West Bengal	Howrah	Ghusuri, Howrah	WBPCB
West Bengal	Howrah	Padmapukur, Howrah	WBPCB
West Bengal	Kolkata	Ballygunge, Kolkata	WBPCB
West Bengal	Kolkata	Bidhannagar, Kolkata	WBPCB
West Bengal	Kolkata	Fort William, Kolkata	WBPCB
West Bengal	Kolkata	Jadavpur, Kolkata	WBPCB
West Bengal	Kolkata	Rabindra Bharati University, Kolkata	WBPCB
West Bengal	Kolkata	Rabindra Sarobar, Kolkata	WBPCB
West Bengal	Kolkata	Victoria, Kolkata	WBPCB
West Bengal	Siliguri	Ward-32 Bapupara, Siliguri	WBPCB

== See also ==
- Air pollution in Delhi
- Firecrackers in India
- List of Kerala cities by ambient air quality
- Hydrogen internal combustion engine auto rickshaw
- Air pollution measurement
- Tragedy of the commons
- BioDME — low-pollution fuel for diesel generators
- Steam reforming of natural gas with methane pyrolysis — CO2-neutral hydrogen production from natural gas
- Petroleum coke
- Criteria air pollutants
- Ghazipur landfill
- Bhalswa landfill
- Air pollution in China
- Air pollution in Germany
- Air pollution in South Korea
- Air pollution in Taiwan
- Air pollution in the United Kingdom
- Air pollution in the United States
- List of countries by air pollution
  - List of most-polluted cities by particulate matter concentration
  - List of least-polluted cities by particulate matter concentration
