= Smoke abatement =

Air pollution reduction program

Smoke abatement programs are designed to reduce air pollution caused by smoke, primarily from burning fuels such as bituminous coal used in industry. Various strategies are used, including regulations, technological advancements, and public awareness campaigns. Early efforts In the United Kingdom in the 19th century focused on reducing smoke from industrial sources. In the 20th century railroad locomotives switched from coal to diesel. More recent initiatives address a wider range of pollutants and sources.

In the United States, rapid industrialization after the Civil War led to a massive increase in soft coal consumption, with coal smoke degrading air quality in the fast-growing cities, and affecting public health. Activism grew in the early 20th century, often led by women's groups concerned about cleanliness and health impacts on vulnerable populations. By 1912, many large cities had smoke abatement laws and inspectors. The Clean Air Act of 1963, administered by the Environmental Protection Agency (EPA) became a foundational law controlling air pollution nationwide, leading to significant improvements in air quality and public health.

== Comparative history: UK and US ==
=== Miasma or germs? ===
The Miasma theory was a prominent idea in the 18th and 19th centuries that gave a false explanation of how deadly epidemics like cholera, yellow fever and malaria ("bad air") originated and spread. It said that illnesses were caused by breathing in a mysterious "miasma"—a harmful vapor that arose from decaying organic matter. Epidemics often came in the summer because that is when people pent more time outside. The theory motivated an enormous emphasis on public sanitation in major cities to remove smelly pollution, especially human and animal excrement, from streets and back alleys. The theory collapsed when physicians accepted the new germ theory of disease in the late 19th century. Germs coughed up by an infected person or spread by certain types of mosquitos or hookworms were the real reason people caught an infectious disease.

=== The challenge ===
The emergence of great factories and the concomitant immense growth in coal consumption gave rise to an unprecedented level of air pollution in industrial centers. After 1900 the large volume of industrial chemical discharges added to the growing load of untreated human waste.

The rapid industrial and urban expansion of America after the Civil War was heavily fueled by bituminous coal, which powered everything from buildings and factories to ships and trains. This widespread reliance on coal led to a dramatic surge in its consumption, exploding 2000% from 21 million tons in 1870 to 407 million tons in forty years. Bituminous coal dominated the nation's energy supply, supporting one million jobs in the coal industry that stretched from mines to every city and town. This progress raised the GNP, but lowered the quality of life in the urban environment, especially downtown and in neighborhoods downwind of the factory districts.

=== The reformers ===
The origins of the environmental movement in Europe and North America lay in response to increasing levels of smoke pollution in the atmosphere during the Industrial Revolution, which began in Great Britain in the 18th century and spread to the United States after 1812. The pervasive problem of coal smoke plagued major cities in Great Britain and the United States for well over a hundred years, according to David Stradling and Peter Thorsheim. From London, Manchester, and Glasgow to Pittsburgh, Chicago, St. Louis, and Cincinnati, industrial centers relying on soft bituminous coal as their primary fuel source suffered through decades of severe air pollution before any relief. British cities, particularly London, were notorious with prolonged smoke and soot. Many U.S. cities faced strikingly similar environmental crises during the late nineteenth and early twentieth centuries. Across the Atlantic, activists shared deep concerns about the effects of coal smoke on vulnerable people and the quality of environment. Despite their different economic, political, and cultural systems, both defined the problem in comparable terms. This led to parallel movements dedicated to smoke abatement, where sanitarians, doctors, engineers, and middle and upper-class reformers, often led by women, engaged in an international dialogue, learning from each other's approaches to finding a solution.

The key problem was that at first industry and the entire community welcomed smoke—it meant plants were in operation—chimneys without smoke was a bad sign that something had gone wrong. The business and political leadership of the industrial cities were enthusiastic backers of the industry; heavy black smoke meant prosperity and high profits. The workers knew that no smoke meant no paycheck.

A new group now entered the scene: women were in charge of cleanliness—whether they ranged from maids who did the laundry, swept every day, and scrubbed the soot off the furniture, to high society hostesses who took pride in their hospitality. Furthermore, women were traditionally responsible for the health of people whose breathing was seriously impeded, especially young children, the elderly, and the sick. Women organized to demand a solution. In the U.S., the General Federation of Women's Clubs and the Daughters of the American Revolution were leaders in the conservation movement. The National Association of Colored Women's Clubs raised environmental awareness in a minority community that had been segregated into the wrong side of the tracks.

By 1912, 23 of the 28 largest American cities had passed smoke abatement ordinances, and nearly all had a smoke inspector. The anti-smoke movement in the United States emerged after 1910 as informal local networks of middle class activists who focused on the emissions of smoke by factories, railroads, and service industries. Some business leaders were on the vanguard of city clean-air campaigns. Shutting down major industries was of course out of the question, but persuasion did work, as the Weather Bureau reported steady declines in the number of smoky days. Pittsburgh had 202 smoky days in 1912 and 144 in 1914.

The term "pollution" in the modern sense was rare before the 1860s. The term "air pollution" was seldom used before he 1930s. According to Adam Rome:

To describe what we now call air pollution--i.e., the gaseous, chemical, and metallic by-products of combustion and industrial processes--people usually talked of "the smoke nuisance." There were several variations of that term --"the smoke problem," "the smoke evil," even "the smoke plague."

== United Kingdom ==
Air pollution in the United Kingdom has long been considered a significant health issue, and it causes numerous other environmental problems such as damage to buildings, forests, and crops. Many areas, especially major cities like London and Manchester, regularly exceed legal and recommended pollution levels. Air pollution in the UK is a major cause of diseases such as asthma, lung disease, stroke, cancer, and heart disease, and it costs the health service, society, and businesses over £20 billion each year. Outdoor pollution alone is estimated to cause 40,000 early deaths each year, which is about 8.3% of deaths.

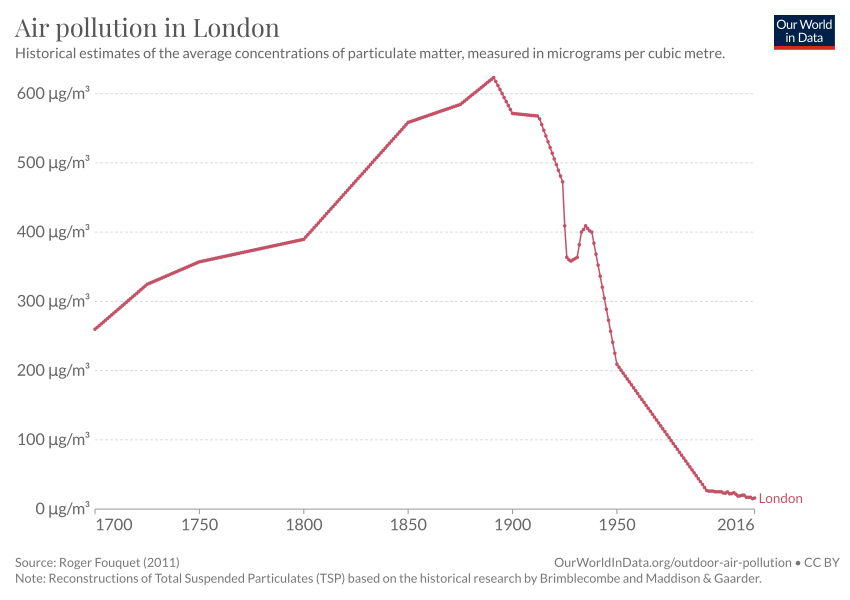
Air pollution in London from 1700 to 2016

=== Prehistory to the 20th century ===
The long history of air pollution in Britain predates the Industrial Revolution by centuries. It began with medieval mining and smelting operations such as Odin Mine. Swiss ice-core research reveals that lead pollution from Peak District smelting between 1170 and 1216 matched Industrial Revolution levels, with pollution spikes correlating to monarchs' expanding power and increased mining activity. King Edward I passed Britain's first environmental law in 1306, banning sulfur-rich seacoal from Northumbria due to its toxic smoke, though the legislation proved largely ineffective through the reign of Queen Elizabeth I.

The Industrial Revolution from 1700 onward made Britain the world's leading source of carbon air pollution until being surpassed by the United States (1888) and Germany (1913). Urban air pollution killed about 1.4 million Britons from 1840 to 1900. The chief causes were pulmonary tuberculosis and bronchitis. This period saw the emergence of health advocacy groups like Leeds' Committee for the Consumption of Smoke, and landmark legislation including the Alkali Act 1863 (regulating industrial acid emissions) and the Public Health Act 1875 (addressing both health and visual pollution effects).

Systematic pollution study began with Robert Angus Smith's first acid rain measurements in 1852, followed by the Committee for the Investigation of Atmospheric Pollution's network of monitoring stations. Early 1900s London studies found smoke caused 20% of fogs and significantly increased death rates during foggy periods. By the 20th century, respiratory diseases became Britain's leading cause of death, with bronchitis death rates in the early 1950s reaching 65 per 100,000 - more than double any other country's rate.

=== Recent ===
==== The Great Smog of 1952 ====
The deadly London fog of December 1952 was the critical catalyst for modern air quality legislation. This "pea-souper," which was far deadlier than previous fogs, caused over 12,000 deaths. It shocked the government and the public into action. This disaster led directly to the formation of the Beaver Committee. Its report established clean air as a national priority, quantified the economic costs of pollution, and laid the groundwork for the Clean Air Act 1956. Key recommendations included empowering local authorities to create smokeless zones—an idea pioneered in Manchester and Coventry—and transferring control of complex industrial emissions to the expert Alkali Inspectorate.

The UK government has plans to improve pollution due to traffic, mainly through the introduction of urban Clean Air Zones and banning the sale of new fossil fuel cars by 2030. It has also phased out the use of coal in its electrical power generation.

== United States ==
=== Clean Air Act of 1963 ===
The Clean Air Act (CAA) is the primary federal air quality law, intended to reduce and control air pollution nationwide. The new law set up two types of air quality standards: primary and secondary. Primary standards focused on safeguarding public health. Secondary standards aimed to protect public welfare, which included preventing harm to materials, agricultural production, ecosystems, and even visibility. This meant the Act's goals for air quality went beyond just health, encompassing a broad range of pollution issues. The federal government was responsible for setting these minimum national standards, and then individual state agencies would implement them.

Initially enacted in 1963 and amended many times since, it is one of the United States' first and most influential modern environmental laws. It is administered by the U.S. Environmental Protection Agency (EPA), in coordination with state, local, and tribal governments.

The EPA's National Ambient Air Quality Standards program sets standards for concentrations of certain pollutants in outdoor air, and the National Emissions Standards for Hazardous Air Pollutants program which sets standards for emissions of particular hazardous pollutants from specific sources. Other programs create requirements for vehicle fuels, industrial facilities, and other technologies and activities that impact air quality. Newer programs tackle specific problems, including acid rain, ozone layer protection, and climate change. The Clean Air Act has substantially reduced air pollution and improved US air quality—benefits which EPA credits with saving trillions of dollars and many thousands of lives each year, especially the most vulnerable youngest and oldest age groups.

== See also ==
- Air pollution
  - Air pollution in the United States
  - Air pollution in Canada
  - Air pollution in China
  - Air pollution in Germany
  - Air pollution in India
    - Air pollution in Delhi
  - Air pollution in South Korea
  - Air pollution in the United Kingdom
  - List of countries by air pollution
    - List of most-polluted cities by particulate matter concentration
    - List of least-polluted cities by particulate matter concentration
- Clean Air Act (United States), 1963 and since
- Diesel Emissions Reduction Act (2005; amended 2010)
- Railroad electrification in the United States
- Smoke inhalation
- Smoking ban
