= Dapple =

Dapple may refer to:

- Dapple, a book by Eleanor Arnason
- DAPPLE Project, a pollution study
- Dapple gray, a type of coat colour seen on horses
- Silver dapple gene, also known as the "Z" gene, that dilutes the black base coat color in horses
- Merle (dog coat), a pattern called "dapple" in the Dachshund dog breed
- "Dapple" is also a common English translation of the Spanish name of Sancho Panza's donkey in Don Quixote; however, the Spanish name "Rucio" is perhaps more accurately translated as "gray-beige" or "taupe".
