= Air (Prevention and Control of Pollution) Act, 1981 =

Act of the Parliament of India

Parliament of India
- Long title: An Act to provide for the prevention, control and abatement of air pollution, for the establishment, with a view to carrying out the aforesaid purposes, of Boards, for conferring on and assigning to such Boards powers and functions relating thereto and for matters connected therewith.
- Citation: Act No. 14 of 1981
- Territorial extent: The whole of India
- Enacted by: Parliament of India
- Enacted: 29 March 1981
- Status: In force

The Air (Prevention and Control of Pollution) Act, 1981 is an Act of the Parliament of India to prevent air pollution in India. The law was amended in 1987. This was the first attempt by the Government of India to combat air pollution.

== See also ==
- Air pollution in India
- Indian Council of Forestry Research and Education
- List of Indian federal legislation
