= List of least-polluted cities by particulate matter concentration =

Below is a list of cities with the annual mean concentration of PM2.5 lower than 10 μg/m^{3} in 2022.

Please note that constraints exist in this type of lists. For instance, some places like Africa and South America lack air pollution reporting tools, so their pollution levels are probably not reflected in this list. Moreover, many cities from a certain country are featured in the list may only mean that they have large and wide air pollution monitoring networks, which may or may not be an indicator of heavy pollution.

Rank	Country / territory	City	Average PM2.5 (μg/m^{3})
1	Switzerland	Zurich	0.49
2	Australia	Perth	1.61
3	South Africa	Richards Bay	2.38
4	Australia	Hobart	2.66
5	Australia	Adelaide	2.67
6	Iceland	Reykjavík	3.38
7	Ukraine	Kryvyi Rih	3.42
8	Australia	Launceston	3.51
9	Australia	Wollongong	3.7
10	Australia	Sydney	3.85
11	United States	Honolulu	3.91
12	Sweden	Uppsala	4.07
13	Finland	Turku	4.17
14	Vietnam	Haiphong	4.28
15	Vietnam	Huế	4.32
16	Finland	Tampere	4.38
17	Australia	Newcastle	4.46
18	Estonia	Tallinn	4.57
19	Canada	Halifax	4.68
20	Canada	Vancouver	4.69
21	Ukraine	Ternopil	4.77
22	Finland	Oulu	4.8
23	Spain	Castellón de la Plana	4.82
24	Norway	Trondheim	4.85
25	Sweden	Stockholm	5
26	Norway	Bergen	5.03
27	Australia	Canberra	5.07
28	United Kingdom	Edinburgh	5.12
29	Australia	Brisbane	5.18
30	Réunion	Saint-Denis	5.21
31	United States	Providence	5.23
32	Ukraine	Ivano-Frankivsk	5.25
33	United States	Tucson	5.25
34	Finland	Helsinki	5.33
35	Portugal	Funchal	5.39
36	New Zealand	Auckland	5.41
37	Taiwan	Taitung City	5.45
38	United Kingdom	Glasgow	5.49
39	United States	Albuquerque	5.51
40	South Africa	Klerksdorp	5.52
41	Finland	Vantaa	5.56
42	New Zealand	Wellington	5.61
43	Japan	Naha	5.73
44	United States	New York City (The Bronx)	5.83
45	Canada	Winnipeg	5.9
46	Canada	Calgary	5.93
47	Australia	Melbourne	5.95
48	Spain	Burgos	5.96
49	Canada	Victoria	5.98
50	Sweden	Gothenburg	5.98
51	United States	Denver	6.23
52	United States	Omaha	6.25
53	Chile	Calama	6.27
54	New Zealand	Christchurch	6.33
55	Canada	Toronto	6.36
56	United States	New York City (Manhattan)	6.4
57	Norway	Stavanger	6.42
58	United States	Salem	6.43
59	Canada	Quebec City	6.44
60	China	Lhasa	6.48
61	Canada	Mississauga	6.48
62	United States	Saint Paul	6.66
63	Canada	Ottawa	6.69
64	United States	Phoenix	6.7
65	Norway	Oslo	6.73
66	United States	El Paso	6.73
67	United States	Portland	6.75
68	United States	Boston	6.75
69	Canada	Edmonton	6.75
70	Ireland	Dublin	6.84
71	Japan	Sapporo	6.85
72	United States	New York City (Queens)	6.85
73	Costa Rica	San José	6.86
74	United Kingdom	Reading	6.91
75	Japan	Sendai	6.91
76	United States	New York City (Brooklyn)	6.95
77	Canada	Kitchener	6.96
78	South Africa	Worcester	6.98
79	United Kingdom	Newport	6.99
80	United States	Miami	6.99
81	United States	Washington, D.C.	6.99
82	Japan	Kanazawa	7.02
83	United States	Hartford	7.05
84	Ukraine	Kyiv	7.08
85	Japan	Niigata	7.11
86	United States	San Francisco	7.14
87	United States	Salt Lake City	7.15
88	Curaçao	Willemstad	7.2
89	United States	New York City (Staten Island)	7.2
90	Canada	Hamilton	7.2
91	Japan	Shizuoka	7.26
92	Belgium	Namur	7.29
93	Canada	Montreal	7.31
94	Japan	Nagano	7.38
95	United States	Boise	7.4
96	United States	San Jose	7.43
97	Spain	Zaragoza	7.43
98	United Kingdom	Belfast	7.51
99	Portugal	Lisbon	7.52
100	United States	Philadelphia	7.58
101	Sweden	Malmö	7.6
102	United States	Sacramento	7.6
103	United States	Raleigh	7.61
104	United States	Richmond	7.62
105	United States	Oakland	7.63
106	United States	Columbus	7.67
107	France	Dijon	7.68
108	United States	Baltimore	7.71
109	United States	Madison	7.78
110	United States	Fort Worth	7.8
111	France	Toulon	7.83
112	Belgium	Liège	7.86
113	United States	Charlotte	7.91
114	United States	Dallas	7.93
115	Japan	Akita	7.93
116	Denmark	Copenhagen	7.99
117	Canada	Surrey	7.99
118	Australia	Darwin	7.99
119	Belgium	Charleroi	8.01
120	Japan	Yokohama	8.01
121	Ukraine	Dnipro	8.02
122	France	Perpignan	8.02
123	France	Caen	8.05
124	United States	Chicago	8.08
125	Germany	Freiburg	8.09
126	United Kingdom	Coventry	8.12
127	Taiwan	Keelung	8.13
128	United Kingdom	London	8.14
129	France	Besançon	8.17
130	Japan	Toyama	8.2
131	Puerto Rico	San Juan	8.21
132	Germany	Darmstadt	8.24
133	Austria	Graz	8.26
134	United Kingdom	Plymouth	8.27
135	United States	Milwaukee	8.28
136	Russia	Krasnoyarsk	8.31
137	Japan	Chiba	8.35
138	United States	Springfield	8.35
139	South Africa	Gqeberha	8.37
140	United Kingdom	Preston	8.41
141	United Kingdom	Liverpool	8.43
142	Spain	Las Palmas	8.46
143	United States	Jacksonville	8.46
144	United States	Seattle	8.47
145	United States	Austin	8.5
146	Japan	Gifu	8.54
147	Netherlands	Groningen	8.56
148	United States	Nashville	8.58
149	Spain	San Sebastián	8.6
150	United States	Tallahassee	8.64
151	France	Saint-Étienne	8.65
152	Germany	Wiesbaden	8.65
153	France	Nantes	8.69
154	United States	Memphis	8.7
155	Japan	Nagoya	8.7
156	United States	Oklahoma City	8.72
157	United States	Little Rock	8.79
158	France	Nîmes	8.82
159	United Kingdom	Swansea	8.83
160	Austria	Salzburg	8.86
161	Japan	Utsunomiya	8.92
162	United Kingdom	Sheffield	8.93
163	United States	Jackson	8.93
164	Germany	Kassel	8.94
165	Japan	Tokyo	8.97
166	Spain	Huelva	8.99
167	Japan	Takamatsu	9
168	France	Tours	9.03
169	United Kingdom	Birmingham	9.04
170	Japan	Kochi	9.05
171	Japan	Saitama	9.07
172	United Kingdom	Leicester	9.08
173	Japan	Wakayama	9.1
174	Japan	Nagasaki	9.11
175	France	Bordeaux	9.12
176	France	Rennes	9.15
177	Croatia	Rijeka	9.15
178	France	Montpellier	9.2
179	United States	San Antonio	9.21
180	Germany	Cologne	9.24
181	United Kingdom	Manchester	9.25
182	Netherlands	Amsterdam	9.26
183	France	Orléans	9.32
184	Japan	Osaka	9.35
185	France	Clermont-Ferrand	9.35
186	Japan	Kobe	9.43
187	Austria	Vienna	9.45
188	Netherlands	The Hague	9.49
189	Germany	Münster	9.55
190	France	Nice	9.58
191	Japan	Kagoshima	9.59
192	Spain	Valencia	9.63
193	United States	Indianapolis	9.63
194	United States	Atlanta	9.64
195	Japan	Hiroshima	9.65
196	Germany	Karlsruhe	9.66
197	Spain	Salamanca	9.74
198	Japan	Nara	9.8
199	Germany	Dresden	9.82
200	United Kingdom	Norwich	9.83
201	Spain	Madrid	9.84
202	United States	Houston	9.85
203	United States	San Diego	9.85
204	Germany	Düsseldorf	9.86
205	United Kingdom	Southend-on-Sea	9.87
206	United States	Detroit	9.89
207	United Kingdom	Bristol	9.93
208	Germany	Potsdam	9.94
209	Singapore	Singapore	9.96
210	Spain	Oviedo	9.96
211	Belgium	Brussels	9.98
212	Spain	Vitoria-Gasteiz	9.99

== See also ==
- List of most-polluted cities by particulate matter concentration
- List of countries by air pollution
- Air quality monitoring
- Air purifier
- Smoke abatement
