= List of cities in Kerala by ambient air quality =

The article lists cities in Kerala according to the WHO's database on ambient (outdoor) air pollution monitoring from almost 1600 cities in 91 countries. It includes 124 Indian cities, eight of which are from Kerala.

| Rank | City | Particulate matter up to 10 micrometers (PM10) | Particulate matter up to 2.5 micrometers (PM2.5) |
|---|---|---|---|
| 1 | Pathanamthitta | 23 | 10 |
| 2 | Kollam | 39 | 17 |
| 3 | Alappuzha | 46 | 20 |
| 4 | Trivandrum | 52 | 23 |
| 5 | Kottayam | 55 | 24 |
| 6 | Kozhikode | 57 | 25 |
| 7 | Kochi | 64 | 28 |
| 8 | Thrissur | 73 | 32 |
