= DAPPLE Project =

Pollution study

The DAPPLE Project (Dispersion of Air Pollution and its Penetration into the Local Environment) was a four-year research project, funded by the UK Engineering and Physical Sciences Research Council. It involved a consortium of six universities between 2002 and 2006. Field work was based at a site at the junction of Marylebone Road and Gloucester Place in central London.

== Transportation study ==
As part of the project a study was designed to measure exposure to air pollution during transportation and looked at five transport methods for travelling across London. It was carried out by a team from Imperial College London and the Health and Safety Laboratory, Buxton co-ordinated by Dr Surbjit Kaur.

The results, published in the journal Atmospheric Environment, showed that the level of pollution that people are exposed to differs according to the mode of transport that they use. The most risky method of transport was the back seat of a cab, followed by travelling by bus, cycling, walking, with a private car exposing people to the lowest amount of pollution.

== See also ==
- Air pollution in the United Kingdom
- Air pollution dispersion terminology
- Atmospheric dispersion modeling
- List of atmospheric dispersion models
