= Clean Air Day =

Annual event in the United Kingdom

Clean Air Day is an annual event designed to focus public and political attention on the problem of air pollution in the United Kingdom. It was held most recently on 18 June 2026.

== Promotion ==
The event, held since 2017, is promoted by the environmental charity Global Action Plan and comprises several hundred independent events organized by local community groups, schools and colleges, NHS trusts, health charities, local authorities, government departments, businesses, and individuals.

== Recognition ==
Clean Air Day produces widespread national and local news coverage, and is often used to focus attention on persistent environmental problems in towns and cities. Public Health England describes the event as "the UK's largest annual air pollution campaign", and its organizers believe it has helped to "double public knowledge" of the issue.
