= List of countries by air pollution =

The following list of countries by air pollution sorts the countries of the world according to their average measured concentration of particulate matter (PM2.5) in micrograms per cubic metre (μg/m^{3}). The World Health Organization's recommended limit is 10 micrograms per cubic metre, although there are also various national guideline values, which are often much higher. Air pollution is among the biggest health problems of modern industrial society and is responsible for more than 10 percent of all deaths worldwide (nearly 4.5 million premature deaths in 2019), according to The Lancet. Air pollution can affect nearly every organ and system of the body, negatively affecting nature and humans alike. Air pollution is a particularly big problem in emerging and developing countries, where global environmental standards often cannot be met. The data in this list refers only to outdoor air quality and not indoor air quality, which caused an additional two million premature deaths in 2019.

World map of the outdoor air pollution death rate by country according to the Global Burden of Disease (2019)

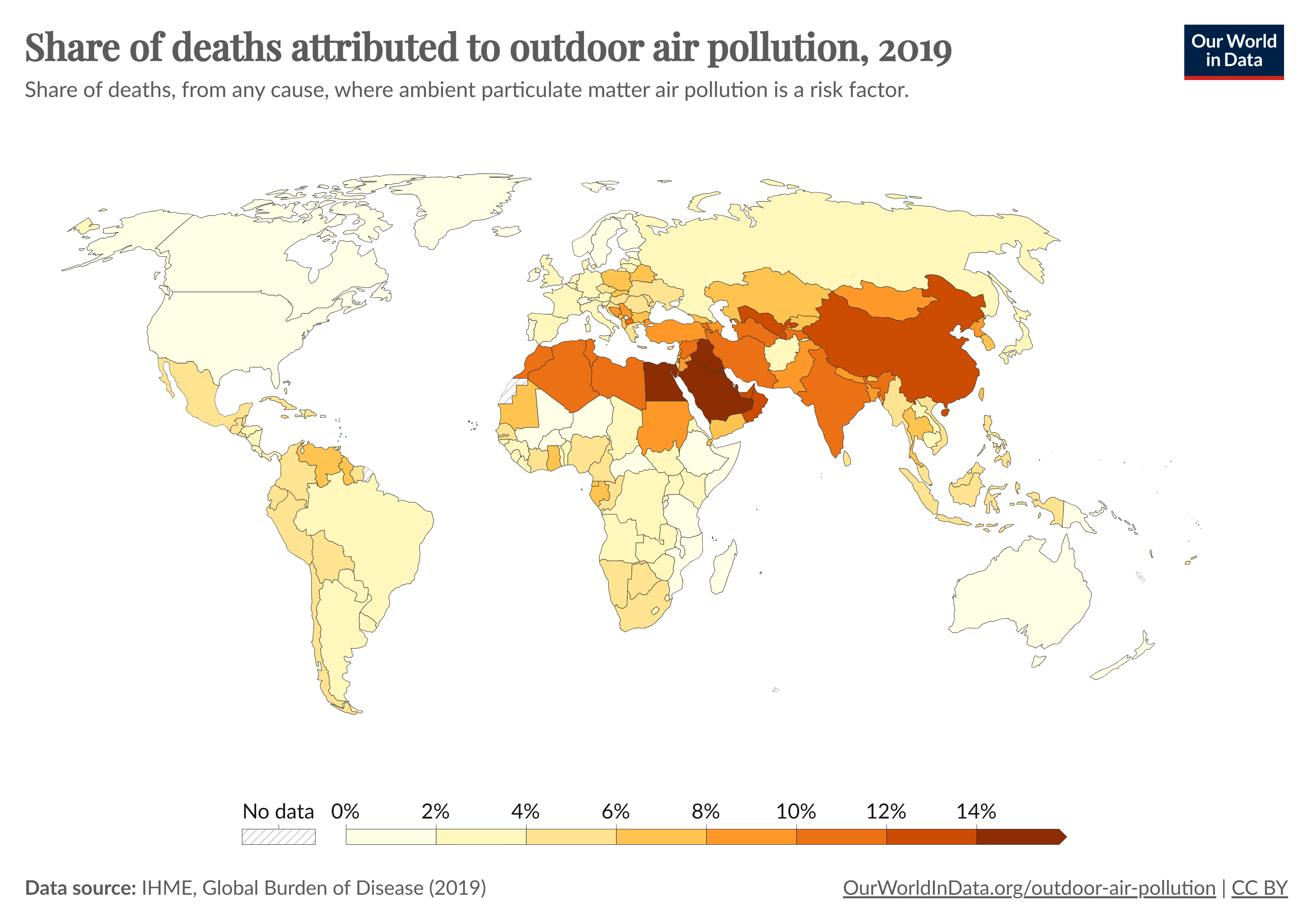
World map of the share of deaths, from any cause, where ambient particulate matter air pollution is a risk factor by country, OWID

== 2022 list (UChicago AQLI 2022) ==
All data are valid for the year 2022 and are taken from the Air Quality Life Index (AQLI) of the University of Chicago. In addition to particulate matter pollution, the modeled potential loss of life expectancy of the population due to particulate matter pollution is given.

Rank	Country	Particulate matter (PM2.5) (in μg/m^{3}) WHO-Guideline=5	Loss of life expectancy (years)
1	India	54.17	−4.82
2	Bangladesh	41.39	−3.57
3	Nepal	39.18	−3.32
4	Qatar	39.16	−3.35
5	Pakistan	38.90	−3.32
6	Democratic Republic of the Congo	34.20	−2.86
7	Burundi	34.04	−2.85
8	Rwanda	33.37	−2.78
9	Equatorial Guinea	32.87	−2.73
10	Cameroon	32.58	−2.70
11	Republic of the Congo	31.94	−2.64
12	Iraq	32.42	−2.69
13	Mongolia	30.10	−2.46
14	Bolivia	29.63	−2.41
15	Myanmar	28.64	−2.32
16	China	28.18	−2.27
17	Lesotho	27.87	−2.24
18	Uganda	27.81	−2.24
19	Saudi Arabia	27.50	−2.20
20	El Salvador	27.43	−2.20
21	Gabon	25.65	−2.02
22	Peru	25.48	−2.01
23	Guatemala	25.13	−1.97
24	Nigeria	25.02	−1.96
25	Central African Republic	24.99	−1.96
26	Honduras	24.52	−1.91
27	Bosnia and Herzegovina	23.93	−1.86
28	Vietnam	23.58	−1.82
29	Laos	23.53	−1.82
30	South Africa	23.26	−1.75
31	Chile	22.84	−0.91
32	Syria	22.82	−1.75
33	Bhutan	22.78	−1.74
34	Bahrain	22.75	−1.74
35	Zambia	22.18	−1.68
36	Kuwait	21.77	−1.64
37	Thailand	21.15	−1.58
38	Turkey	21.10	−1.58
39	Angola	21.07	−1.57
40	South Korea	20.82	−1.55
41	United Arab Emirates	20.71	−1.54
42	Jordan	19.70	−1.44
43	Armenia	19.51	−1.42
44	Philippines	19.17	−1.39
45	Egypt	19.16	−1.39
46	Sri Lanka	19.13	−1.38
47	North Macedonia	19.02	−1.37
48	Bulgaria	18.86	−1.36
49	Iran	18.80	−1.35
50	Uzbekistan	18.64	−1.34
51	Lebanon	18.62	−1.33
52	North Korea	18.60	−1.33
53	Djibouti	18.43	−1.32
54	Ecuador	18.32	−1.31
55	Indonesia	18.25	−1.30
56	Tanzania	18.17	−1.29
57	Malawi	17.61	−1.24
58	Benin	17.31	−1.21
59	Republic of China	17.29	−1.20
60	Tajikistan	17.08	−1.18
61	Afghanistan	16.98	−1.17
62	Serbia	16.95	−1.17
63	Cambodia	16.94	−1.17
64	Ethiopia	16.94	−1.17
65	Yemen	16.76	−1.15
66	Kenya	16.47	−1.12
67	Eswatini	16.38	−1.12
68	Colombia	16.23	−1.10
69	South Sudan	15.97	−1.08
70	Zimbabwe	15.97	−1.08
71	Mexico	15.64	−1.04
72	Togo	15.64	−1.04
73	Montenegro	15.09	−0.99
74	Cyprus	14.68	−0.95
75	Nicaragua	14.62	−0.94
76	Northern Cyprus	14.51	−0.93
77	Namibia	14.49	−0.93
78	Papua New Guinea	14.45	−0.93
79	Eritrea	14.43	−0.92
80	Israel	14.32	−0.91
81	Croatia	14.15	−0.90
82	Poland	14.09	−0.89
83	Palestine	13.99	−0.88
84	Singapore	13.89	−0.87
85	Ghana	13.73	−0.86
86	Romania	13.67	−0.85
87	Georgia	13.65	−0.85
88	San Marino	13.51	−0.83
89	Oman	13.44	−0.83
90	Malaysia	13.31	−0.81
91	Paraguay	13.23	−0.81
92	Jamaica	13.17	−0.80
93	Italy	13.11	−0.79
94	Mozambique	12.70	−0.75
95	Costa Rica	12.63	−0.75
96	Albania	12.60	−0.74
97	Greece	12.56	−0.74
98	Botswana	12.47	−0.73
99	Argentina	12.44	−0.73
100	Slovenia	12.32	−0.72
101	Latvia	12.14	−0.70
102	Slovakia	12.10	−0.70
103	Kyrgyzstan	12.09	−0.69
104	Brazil	12.06	−0.69
105	Kazakhstan	12.01	−0.69
106	Venezuela	11.96	−0.68
107	Hungary	11.93	−0.68
108	Azerbaijan	11.87	−0.67
109	Czech Republic	11.49	−0.64
110	Moldova	11.49	−0.64
111	Chad	11.27	−0.61
112	Japan	11.26	−0.61
113	Vatican City	11.10	−0.60
114	Timor-Leste	10.96	−0.58
115	Liechtenstein	10.82	−0.57
116	Ukraine	10.81	−0.57
117	Niger	10.56	−0.54
118	Ivory Coast	10.45	−0.53
119	Turkmenistan	10.38	−0.53
120	São Tomé and Príncipe	10.28	−0.52
121	Sudan	10.18	−0.51
122	Tunisia	10.18	−0.51
123	Haiti	9.92	−0.48
124	Monaco	9.90	−0.48
125	Belize	9.89	−0.48
126	Sierra Leone	9.87	−0.48
127	Belarus	9.84	−0.47
128	Guinea	9.82	−0.47
129	Madagascar	9.70	−0.46
130	Panama	9.65	−0.46
131	Lithuania	9.53	−0.44
132	Austria	9.52	−0.44
133	Liberia	9.39	−0.43
134	Russia	9.30	−0.42
135	Uruguay	9.08	−0.40
136	Somalia	8.90	−0.38
137	Libya	8.89	−0.38
138	Belgium	8.82	−0.37
139	Switzerland	8.73	−0.37
140	Andorra	8.72	−0.36
141	Burkina Faso	8.66	−0.36
142	Germany	8.51	−0.34
143	Netherlands	8.49	−0.34
144	France	8.45	−0.34
145	United Kingdom	8.28	−0.32
146	Maldives	8.20	−0.31
147	Mayotte	8.15	−0.31
148	Cayman Islands	8.00	−0.29
149	Luxembourg	8.00	−0.29
150	Guinea-Bissau	7.94	−0.29
151	Dominican Republic	7.86	−0.28
152	Spain	7.50	−0.24
153	Gibraltar	7.30	−0.23
154	Malta	7.16	−0.21
155	Guyana	7.15	−0.21
156	Denmark	7.08	−0.20
157	Morocco	7.06	−0.20
158	Solomon Islands	7.02	−0.20
159	Comoros	6.99	−0.20
160	United States	6.91	−0.19
161	Gambia	6.86	−0.18
162	Mali	6.63	−0.16
163	Cuba	6.34	−0.13
164	Brunei	6.33	−0.13
165	Algeria	6.14	−0.11
166	Suriname	6.05	−0.10
167	Canada	6.04	−0.10
168	Portugal	5.67	−0.07
169	Senegal	5.67	−0.07
170	Mauritius	5.65	−0.06
171	Estonia	5.61	−0.06
172	French Guiana	5.53	−0.05
173	Ireland	5.41	−0.04
174	Vanuatu	5.12	−0.01
175	Seychelles	4.96	0.00
176	Norway	4.88	0.00
177	Sweden	4.86	0.00
178	Western Sahara	4.84	0.00
179	Finland	4.37	0.00
180	Trinidad and Tobago	3.90	0.00
181	Curaçao	3.70	0.00
182	New Zealand	3.69	0.00
183	Mauritania	3.51	0.00
184	Aruba	3.40	0.00
185	Australia	3.36	0.00
186	Fiji	3.23	0.00
187	Bahamas	3.11	0.00
188	Iceland	2.90	0.00
189	Bermuda	2.80	0.00
190	Réunion	2.74	0.00
191	Martinique	2.72	0.00
192	Faroe Islands	2.61	0.00
193	Falklands	2.60	0.00
194	Palau	2.40	0.00
195	Saint Kitts and Nevis	2.40	0.00
196	Dominica	2.34	0.00
197	Puerto Rico	2.21	0.00
198	Grenada	2.19	0.00
199	Cape Verde	2.18	0.00
200	Saint Vincent and the Grenadines	2.15	0.00
201	Saint Lucia	2.02	0.00
202	Barbados	2.00	0.00
203	Tonga	1.98	0.00
204	Antigua and Barbuda	1.79	0.00
205	US Virgin Islands	1.75	0.00
206	Samoa	1.69	0.00
207	Tuvalu	1.56	0.00
208	British Virgin Islands	1.52	0.00
209	French Polynesia	1.40	0.00
210	American Samoa	1.40	0.00
211	Guam	1.19	0.00
212	Nauru	1.18	0.00
213	Cook Islands	1.13	0.00
214	Greenland	1.11	0.00
215	Marshall Islands	1.02	0.00
216	Federated States of Micronesia	0.94	0.00
217	Kiribati	0.90	0.00

== List (2018−2023) ==
All data are valid for the year 2018-2023 and are taken from the IQAir 2023 World Air Quality Ranking.

List of Countries/Regions by particulate matter (PM2.5) in (μg/m^{3})
Rank	Country/Region	2018	2019	2020	2021	2022	2023	Population
1	India	97.1	83.3	77.1	76.9	65.8	79.9	1,438,069,596
2	Bangladesh	74.3	65.8	59	66.8	70.9	73.7	231,402,117
3	Tajikistan	72.5	58.1	51.9	58.1	53.3	54.4	10,747,209
4	Pakistan	--	--	30.9	59.4	46	49	9,750,064
5	Burkina Faso	--	--	--	--	63	46.6	22,100,683
6	Iraq	--	39.6	--	49.7	80.1	43.8	43,533,592
7	United Arab Emirates	49.9	38.9	29.2	36	45.9	43	9,365,145
8	Nepal	54.1	44.5	39.2	46	40.1	42.4	30,034,989
9	Egypt	--	18	--	29.1	46.5	42.4	109,262,178
10	Democratic Republic of the Congo	--	32.1	--	--	15.5	40.8	95,894,118
11	Kuwait	56	38.3	34	29.7	55.8	39.9	4,250,114
12	Bahrain	59.8	46.8	39.7	49.8	66.6	39.2	1,463,265
13	Qatar	--	--	44.3	38.2	42.5	37.6	2,688,235
14	Indonesia	42	51.7	40.7	34.3	30.4	37.1	273,753,191
15	Rwanda	--	--	--	--	44	36.8	13,461,888
16	Zimbabwe	--	--	--	--	--	33.3	15,993,524
17	Ghana	--	30.3	26.9	25.9	30.2	33.2	32,833,031
18	Kyrgyzstan	--	33.2	43.5	50.8	31.1	33.1	6,691,800
19	China	41.2	39.1	34.7	32.6	30.6	32.5	1,412,360,000
20	Libya	--	--	--	--	--	30.4	6,735,277
21	Laos	--	23.1	22.4	21.5	27.6	29.6	7,275,556
22	Vietnam	32.9	34.1	28	24.7	27.2	29.6	97,468,029
23	Uzbekistan	34.3	41.2	29.9	42.8	33.5	28.6	34,915,100
24	Gambia	--	--	--	--	--	28.5	2,639,916
25	Myanmar	--	31	29.4	25.9	24.3	28.2	53,798,084
26	Senegal	--	--	11.2	--	20.4	28.2	16,876,720
27	Bosnia Herzegovina	40	34.6	40.6	27.8	33.6	27.5	3,270,943
28	Uganda	40.8	29.1	26.1	27.6	39.6	27.3	45,853,778
29	Ethiopia	27.1	20.1	14.7	23.9	31.3	27	120,283,026
30	Saudi Arabia	--	22.1	23.3	32.7	41.5	26.5	35,950,396
31	Armenia	--	25.5	24.9	33.9	31.4	26.4	2,790,974
32	North Macedonia	35.5	32.4	30.6	25.4	25.6	25.2	2,065,092
33	Zambia	--	--	--	--	24.6	24.1	19,473,125
34	Cameroon	--	--	--	--	--	24	27,198,628
35	Nigeria	44.8	21.4	--	34	36.9	23.9	213,401,323
36	Thailand	26.4	24.3	21.4	20.2	18.1	23.3	71,601,103
37	Cambodia	20.1	21.1	21.1	19.8	8.3	22.8	16,589,023
38	Malaysia	--	19.4	15.6	19.4	17.7	22.5	33,573,874
39	Mongolia	58.5	62	46.6	33.1	29.5	22.5	3,347,782
40	Kazakhstan	29.8	23.6	21.9	31.1	23	22.2	19,000,988
41	Montenegro	--	--	26.1	35.2	15.7	21.3	619,211
42	Madagascar	--	--	20	21	23.7	20.6	28,915,653
43	Serbia	23.9	23.3	24.3	25.5	24.7	20.5	6,834,326
44	Turkey	21.9	20.6	18.7	20	21.1	20.3	84,775,404
45	Taiwan	18.5	17.2	15	16.2	13.4	20.2	23,816,775
46	Mexico	20.3	20	18.9	19.3	19.5	20.1	126,705,138
47	South Africa	--	21.6	18	22.7	23.4	19.9	59,392,255
48	El Salvador	--	--	--	--	14.2	19.5	6,314,167
49	Sri Lanka	32	25.2	22.4	17.4	20.7	19.3	22,156,000
50	South Korea	24	24.8	19.5	19.1	18.3	19.2	51,744,876
51	Peru	28	23.3	17.9	29.6	23.5	18.8	33,715,471
52	Azerbaijan	--	--	--	17.6	18.9	18.8	10,137,750
53	Chile	24.9	22.6	19.3	21.7	22.2	18.8	19,493,184
54	Guatemala	--	20.2	19.2	19.5	18.6	18.7	17,109,746
55	Palestinian Territory	--	--	--	--	--	18.6	3,000,021
56	Israel	18.6	20.8	16.9	18.7	18.8	17.8	9,364,000
57	Greece	--	22.5	18.4	19	19	17.4	10,641,221
58	Guyana	--	--	--	--	12.6	17.1	804,567
59	Gabon	--	--	--	--	25	16.9	2,341,179
60	Albania	--	--	16	12.5	14.5	16.7	2,811,666
61	Ivory Coast	--	--	21.9	--	22.5	16.6	29,389,150
62	Georgia	--	20.1	20.4	21	17	16.4	3,708,610
63	Togo	--	--	--	--	--	16.3	8,644,829
64	Macao SAR	21.2	23.5	17.8	17	15.4	16.2	686,607
65	Moldova	--	--	--	--	22.6	15.7	2,615,199
66	Nicaragua	--	--	--	--	8.9	15.7	6,850,540
67	Romania	18.6	18.3	15.8	15.3	17.2	15.7	19,119,880
68	Hong Kong SAR	20.2	20.3	15.4	15.9	14.5	15.6	7,413,100
69	Maldives	--	--	--	--	10.9	15.3	521,457
70	Honduras	--	--	--	11.8	10.2	15.1	10,278,345
71	Italy	14.9	17.1	18.5	15.2	18.9	15	59,109,668
72	Slovenia	--	--	--	13.3	15.1	14.9	2,108,079
73	Cyprus	17.6	19.7	15.8	14.8	15.6	14.3	1,244,188
74	Poland	22.4	18.7	16.9	19.1	16.3	14.1	37,747,124
75	Colombia	13.9	14.6	15.6	14.1	15.7	14.1	51,516,562
76	Guinea	--	--	--	--	--	13.9	13,531,906
77	Croatia	22.2	19.1	21.2	25.4	23.5	13.8	3,899,000
78	Algeria	--	21.2	20.2	20	17.8	13.8	44,177,969
79	Philippines	14.6	17.6	12.8	15.6	14.9	13.5	113,880,328
80	Singapore	14.8	19	11.8	13.8	13.3	13.4	5,453,566
81	Bulgaria	25.8	25.5	27.5	16.3	18.3	13.2	6,877,743
82	Slovakia	18.5	16.1	15.3	16	14.5	13.1	5,447,247
83	Brazil	16.3	15.8	14.2	13.6	12.2	12.6	214,326,223
84	Bolivia	--	--	--	--	7.3	12.6	12,079,472
85	Kosovo	30.4	23.5	20	14.7	14.7	12.1	1,786,038
86	Malta	11	9.4	11.8	13.5	11.7	12	518,536
87	Hungary	16.8	14.6	14.3	15.5	12.6	12	9,709,891
88	Uruguay	--	--	--	14.2	11.3	11.7	3,426,260
89	Czech Republic	20.2	14.4	12.3	13.9	13.4	11.5	10,505,772
90	Kenya	--	--	14.2	14.3	11.5	10.6	53,005,614
91	Suriname	--	--	--	--	7	10.6	612,985
92	Lithuania	17.5	14.5	11.7	13.2	13.2	10.4	2,800,839
93	Canada	7.9	7.7	7.3	8.5	7.4	10.3	38,246,108
94	Russia	11.4	9.9	9.3	12.3	11.2	10	143,449,286
95	Spain	10.3	9.7	10.4	10.7	10.9	9.9	47,415,750
96	Japan	12	11.4	9.8	9.1	9.1	9.6	125,681,593
97	Panama	--	--	--	--	9	9.6	4,351,267
98	Austria	15	12.2	10.9	11.4	10.6	9.6	8,955,797
99	France	13.2	12.3	11.1	11.4	11.5	9.5	67,749,632
100	Belgium	13.5	12.5	8.9	11.5	10.8	9.4	11,592,952
101	Argentina	--	14.6	14.2	8.2	7.7	9.2	45,808,747
102	USA	9.1	9	9.6	10.3	8.9	9.1	331,893,745
103	Germany	13	11	10.1	10.6	11	9	83,196,078
104	Switzerland	11.6	10.9	9	10.8	10	8.9	8,703,405
105	Luxembourg	11.2	9.6	9	9	7.4	8.9	640,064
106	Netherlands	11.7	10.9	9.7	11.3	11	8.7	17,533,044
107	Ukraine	14	16.6	19.2	18.5	9.7	8.6	43,792,855
108	Belize	--	--	--	--	5.6	8.3	400,031
109	Latvia	--	13.3	11.3	--	10.1	8	1,884,490
110	Andorra	--	--	7.4	7.3	5.4	7.9	79,034
111	Angola	--	15.9	13	11	8.8	7.8	34,503,774
112	United Kingdom	10.8	10.5	8.3	8.8	8.9	7.7	67,326,569
113	Denmark	--	9.6	9.4	9.6	8.6	7.7	5,856,733
114	Anguilla	--	--	--	--	--	7.4	15,094
115	Ecuador	--	8.6	7.6	8.4	--	7.4	17,797,737
116	Liechtenstein	--	--	--	7.2	8.3	7.2	39,039
117	Jamaica	--	--	--	--	--	7.1	2,827,695
118	Portugal	9.4	9.3	9.1	7.1	8.1	6.8	10,325,147
119	Ireland	9.5	10.6	8.6	8	7.5	6.3	5,033,165
120	Norway	7.6	6.9	5.7	7.5	7	6.3	5,408,320
121	Costa Rica	--	10.4	8.2	7.8	7.9	6.1	5,153,957
122	Trinidad and Tobago	--	--	--	7.1	5.1	5.8	1,525,663
123	Bahamas	--	3.3	--	5.5	--	5.2	407,906
124	Sweden	7.4	6.6	5	6.6	6.2	5.1	10,415,811
125	Finland	6.6	5.6	5	5.5	5	4.9	5,541,017
126	Estonia	7.2	6.2	5.9	5.9	4.9	4.7	1,330,932
127	Puerto Rico	13.7	10.2	3.7	4.8	4.3	4.5	3,263,584
128	Australia	6.8	8	7.6	5.7	4.2	4.5	25,688,079
129	New Zealand	7.7	7.5	7	6.8	4.8	4.3	5,122,600
130	Bermuda	--	--	--	--	3	4.1	63,867
131	Grenada	--	--	--	5.5	3.8	4.1	124,610
132	Iceland	5	5.5	7.2	6.1	3.4	4	372,520
133	Mauritius	--	--	--	--	--	3.5	1,266,060
134	French Polynesia	--	--	--	--	2.5	3.2	304,032
