= Nowcasting =

Nowcasting or Nowcast may refer to:

- Nowcasting (economics), the estimate of the current state of the economy
- Nowcasting (meteorology), the weather forecasting for a short period of up to a few hours
  - 3D nowcasting, the prediction of precipitation several minutes before it occurs
- NowCast (air quality index), the real time estimate of the air quality as well as the few hours prediction of ozone concentration
- Nowcasting (seismology), the estimate of the current state of a seismological system in earthquake forecasting
