= Air pollution in Canada =

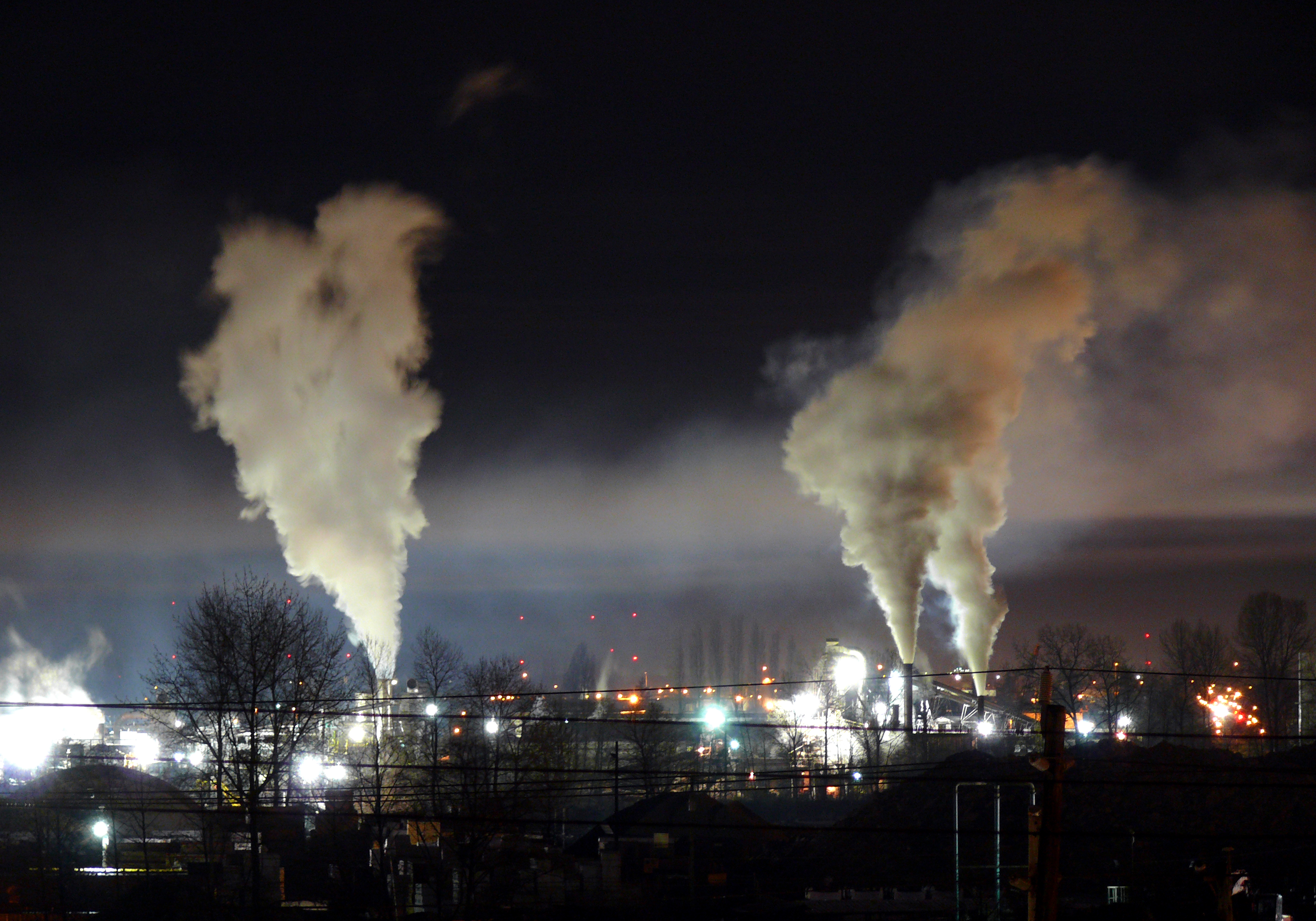
Industry is a significant source of air pollution in Canada.

Air pollution is the release of pollutants (a substance or energy introduced into the environment that has undesired effects) into the air that are detrimental to human health and the Earth. In Canada, air pollution is regulated by standards set by the Canadian Council of Ministers of the Environment (CCME), an inter-governmental body of federal, provincial and territorial Ministers responsible for the environment. Air pollution from the United States and to lesser extent Canada; caused by metal smelting, coal-burning for utilities, and vehicle emissions has resulted in acid rain, has severely impacted Canadian waterways, forest growth, and agricultural productivity.

Pollution reduces the value of the assets that make up Canadians' wealth. Properties are less valuable when they are polluted. It is estimated that pollution costs Canada tens of billions of dollars every year. Transportation is one of the main sources of air pollution and greenhouse gas emissions in Canada and are responsible for more than a quarter of all greenhouse gases and air pollutants in Canada. Pollutants' concentrations in the air can be influenced by many factors, such as the number of air pollutants, proximity to sources, and weather conditions. Canada's population and economy growth increases the demand for the production and supply of services, transportation and housing. The energy required to meet such demands comes partially from fossil fuels, which affects air quality. The growing demand for Canadian exports, such as the oil and gas industry, also generates the release of air pollutants.

== Exposure and control ==
According to a recent study in 2018, Canada ranks 9th out of the 33 richest and cleanest countries on the planet for overall air quality.

Health Canada states that each person in Canada is exposed to air pollution, and that even at low levels, it can affect human health. Scientific research shows that air pollution leads to disease, increased hospitalizations, and premature death.

Although air pollution is a mixture of substances, most health effects are associated with the major components of smog which include the following:

- fine particulate matter
- nitrogen dioxide
- ozone
- sulfur dioxide

Air pollution levels are relatively low in Canada compared to other countries but managing air pollution is still a concern for the Government of Canada. The CCME has set Canada Wide Standards (CWS). These are:

- CWS for PM2.5 = 30 μg/m^{3} (24-hour averaging time, by year 2010, based on 98th percentile ambient measurement annually, averaged over 3 consecutive years).
- CWS for ozone = 65 ppb (8-hour averaging time, by year 2010, achievement is based on the 4th highest measurement annually, averaged over 3 consecutive years).

Note that there is no consequence in Canada to not achieving these standards. In addition, these only apply to jurisdictions with populations greater than 100,000. Further, provinces and territories may set more stringent standards than those set by the CCME.

== Health impacts ==
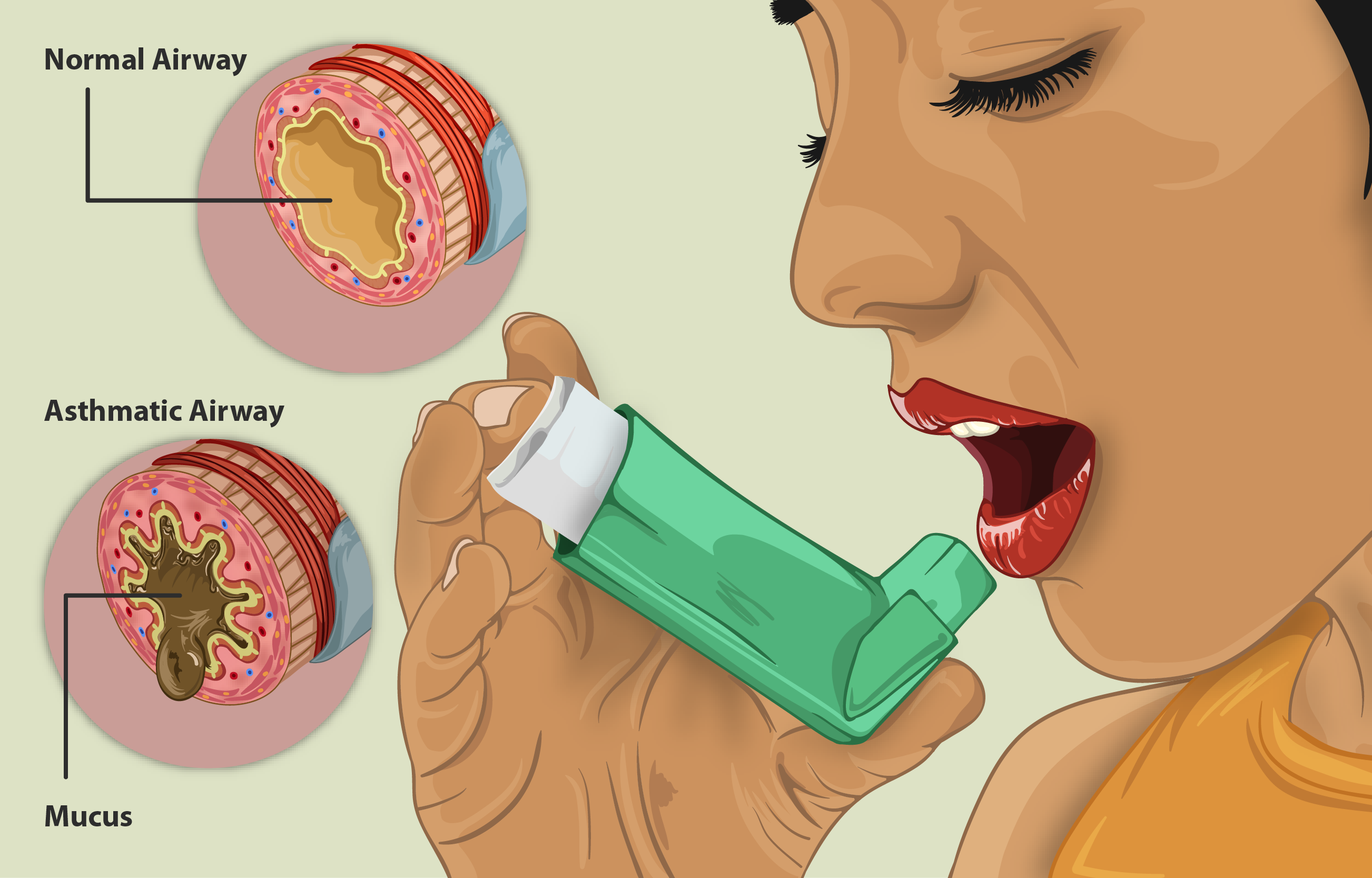
Asthmatic airway versus normal lungs' airway

The Government of Canada estimates that 14,600 premature deaths per year in Canada can be linked to air pollution from fine particulate matter, nitrogen dioxide and ozone, from the report Health Impacts of Air Pollution in Canada – Estimates of Morbidity Outcomes and Premature Mortalities - 2019. The number of asthma symptom days reach 2.7 million, while the number of acute respiratory symptom days reach 35 million. The total economic assessment of the health impacts related to air pollution in Canada is $114 billion per year (according to 2015).

Ambient levels of the pollutants are determined from a combination of: satellite measurements, ground measurements, and air quality computer models.

Maps are created to show air pollution levels across Canada for each pollutant and the relevant distribution of the population across Canada. The exposure of Canadians to air pollution is estimated by combining the air pollution and population maps. Health Canada uses a computer model called the Air Quality Benefits Assessment Tool (AQBAT). The AQBAT model has mathematical equations that show relations between air pollution and health effects. The equations are based on scientific findings and the AQBAT model generates an estimate of the number of premature deaths in Canada. The scientific method used is similar to those used by other health organizations, both in Canada and internationally. All conclude that air pollution has significant impacts on human health.

== Control by province ==
=== Alberta ===
Alberta has motives to address cumulative environmental impacts through regional plans under the Land Use Framework. Recent studies observed positive associations between outdoor air pollution and emergency department visits for asthma in Alberta. The frameworks identify regional objectives and set thresholds like targets and limits. Industrial air quality is managed mostly through environmental assessment, approvals and enforcement. Acid Deposition Management Framework, Canadian Ambient Air Quality Standards For Particulate Matter and Ozone, and Emissions Management Framework for the Alberta Electricity Sector Management are frameworks in effect. Ambient air monitoring in Alberta includes assessing impact of releases on the environment, pollution control technologies and tracking trends in environmental performance and effects. Community monitoring uses stations to measure the level of air pollution and track trends over time, while perimeter monitoring involves discrete sampling of substances at various locations along an industrial facility's property boundary to measure the level of pollution leaving a facility. Alberta Environment and Parks' researchers are also actively involved in studies about wildfire smoke and air quality, studying fine particulate matter and other air pollutants during the Horse River Wildfire in the Fort McMurray area.

In the north and northeast of Alberta, oil sands deposits are present are important to the Alberta and Canadian economy but bring attention to the national and international level about their potential effects on the environment and public health. An interest at the national and international level about the status of air quality in the oil sands region of Alberta has risen. Alberta's oil sands are the third largest reservoir of crude oil in the world with proven oil reserves of 170 billion barrels, with 1.7 billion barrels of conventional crude oil after Venezuela and Saudi Arabia.

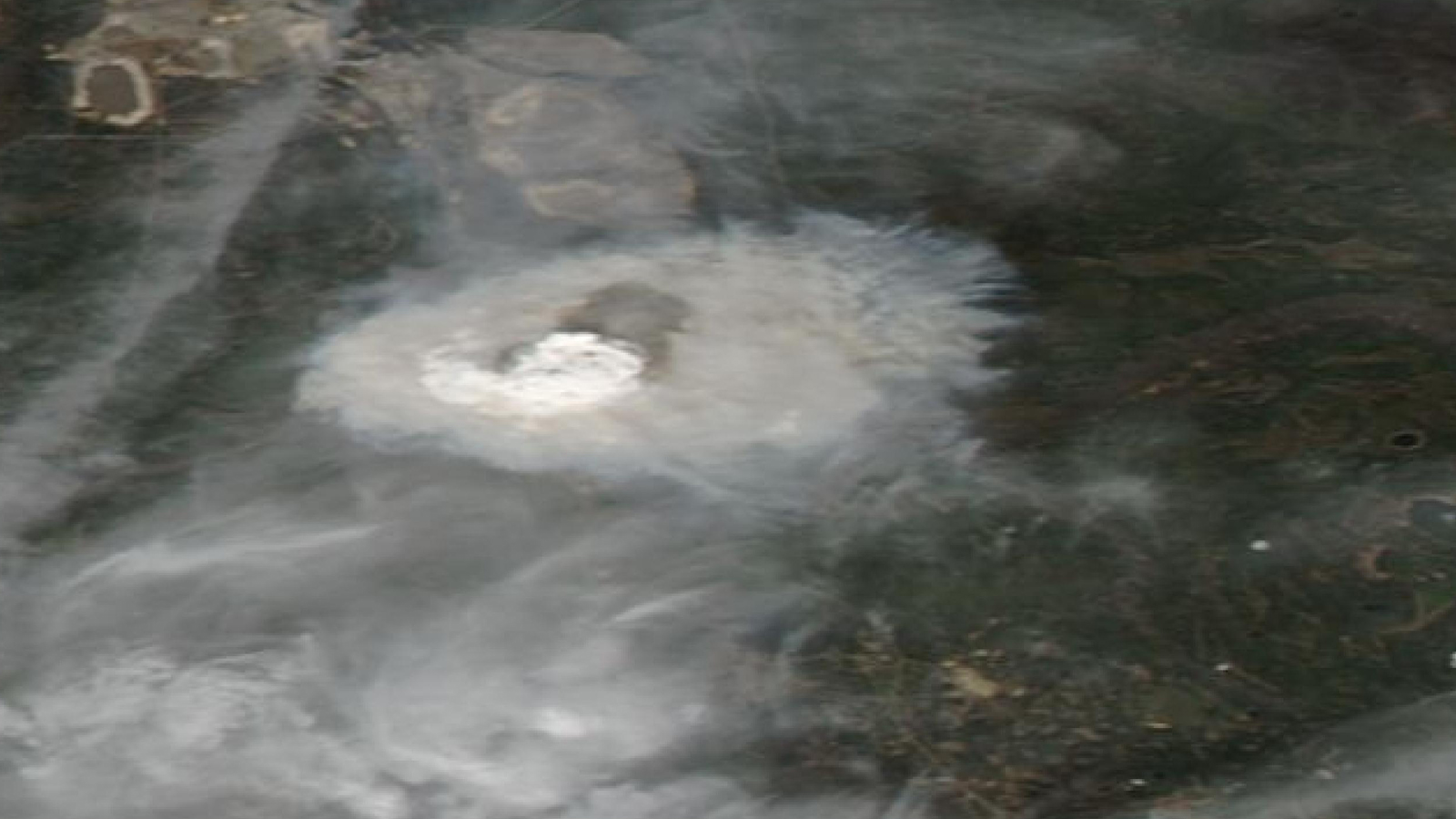
A Fort McMurray Wildfire

=== Manitoba ===
In cooperation with Environment Canada, ambient air is monitored on selected urban areas within Manitoba. Manitoba is compliant with the Canadian Ambient Air Quality Standards (CAAQS) for fine particulate matter (PM2.5) and ground-level ozone.

=== New Brunswick ===
Fuel production causes majority of the air pollution in New Brunswick. Emissions come from engines, homes and industrial heating systems, from manufacturing operations and power-generating stations. Forest fires also occur and can be a major natural source of air pollution.. Major weather systems reach New Brunswick from the west and up the Atlantic seaboard, bringing pollutants from the more industrialized and densely populated areas of the United States and central Canada. In the southern part of the province, air from the Bay of Fundy can slow the dispersal of air pollutants and trap them close to ground level. There are more than 60 separate locations across the province monitor ambient air quality all year round.

=== Newfoundland and Labrador ===
National Air Pollution Surveillance (NAPS) is a cooperation of federal, provincial, territorial and some regional governments measuring air quality throughout Canada. It is in place in the province and supports air quality programs across Canada designed to protect human health and the environment. Air Monitoring sites located in St. John's, Mount Pearl, Grand Falls-Windsor, Corner Brook and Port Aux Choix are NAPS stations. The Air Monitoring site located in Burin is a temporary mobile station. The air monitoring site located in Labrador City is an industrial station for which Environment Canada has added an ozone monitor to predict an air quality health index for the area. Data from the NAPS Program are included in the Canada-wide Air Quality Database and are published in annual air quality data summary reports.

=== Nova Scotia ===
The main sources of air pollution in Nova Scotia come burning fossil fuels for electricity generation and transportation. Residential wood burning is also a significant contributor of air pollution in Nova Scotia. The province has air monitoring stations in Aylesford, Dartmouth, Halifax, Pictou, Port Hawkesbury and Sydney. They provide technical support for a station on Sable Island and Environment Canada maintains stations in Dayton, Kejimkujik National Park and Kentville. The stations are located in commercial, industrial and residential areas. Nova Scotia also has an acid rain monitoring station at Sherbrooke in Guysborough County. There are targets in place for the province to reduce its sulfur dioxide, mercury and nitrogen oxides emissions.

=== Ontario ===
The Ministry of the Environment, Conservation and Parks aims to protect and improve air quality through legislation, targeted programs, and partnerships with other jurisdictions in Ontario. It works with a network of 38 ambient air monitoring stations across Ontario that collect real-time air pollution data. This information is communicated to the public through Ontario's new Air Quality Health Index with hourly concentrations of pollutants. Every year, air quality is reported to assess the state of air quality in Ontario based on the provincial Air Quality Health Index network.

Previous studies in Canada indicated that people living close to major roads had mortality rate advancements of 2.5 years and a significant increase in all-cause mortality of 18%. Such health effects might be due to higher intake fractions and subsequent doses for residents living near roadways or to the higher toxicity of traffic pollutants compared with other sources. A study in Toronto, the most populated city in Canada, took place, where many urban roads cross the city, exposing citizens to wide range of variation in traffic with its related pollutants. It found a 40% increase in circulatory mortality from an exposure from nitrogen dioxide. Exposure to traffic-related air pollution was significantly associated with increased all-cause and circulatory mortality in the study.

The law in Ontario regulates contaminants released to air by sources such as industrial and commercial facilities, to control exposure to contaminants If a business emits any contaminants to the air, it must comply with the regulation by meeting certain standards that may apply. There are three compliance approaches under the regulation:

- meet the general air standard
- request and meet a site-specific standard
- register and meet the requirements under a sector-based technical standard

=== Prince Edward Island ===
Prince Edward Island is implemented an acid rain reduction plan as a result of commitments made at the 1998 Conference of New England Governors and Eastern Canadian Premiers. The Canada-wide Standard for Particulate Matter is PM2.5 with an optional PM10 value of 60 μg/m3, over a 24- hour period by the year 2010. Prince Edward Island's PM10 and PM2.5 numbers are significantly lower as the air is relatively clean.

=== Quebec ===
In a study in Montreal, fixed-site air pollution monitors provided daily mean levels of ozone, particles, and other gaseous pollutants. Information on the date and underlying cause of death was obtained for residents of Montreal who died in the city between 1984 and 1993. They found that, an increase to the mean level of ozone was associated with a 21% increase over the mean number of daily ER visits.

=== Saskatchewan ===
Saskatchewan has a network of 19 continuous air monitoring stations. These stations track emissions from industry, mining, agriculture, forest fires and vehicles. Air pollution levels are normally quite low in Saskatchewan except during forest fires and pockets of gas emissions connected to the energy sector. Air pollutant volume measures the amounts of major air pollutants released each year in Saskatchewan.

== Control in territories ==
=== Northwest Territories ===
The Government of the Northwest Territories aims to protect and manage air quality by monitoring air quality as part of a Canada-wide network, giving recommendations and oversight during industrial regulatory processes, providing current and historical air quality data, including real-time data from four community monitoring stations in Inuvik, Norman Wells, Fort Smith and Yellowknife and being in the Canada-wide Air Quality Management System to ensure consistent air quality management across the country. The government of Northwest Territories reports information on air quality monitoring network operations, air pollutants monitored, air quality standards used to assess the monitoring results, and trends in NWT air quality annually.

=== Nunavut ===
The Government of Nunavut Department of Environment launched the federal Air Quality Health Index (AQHI) program in Iqaluit, Kugluktuk and Arviat in 2018. The most common air contaminants there are fine and coarse particulate matter, Total Suspended Particulate, Nitrogen dioxide, Sulphur dioxide and ground-level ozone.

=== Yukon ===
The Government of Yukon collaborates with the City of Whitehorse and federal agencies to monitor air quality. Industry also conducts air quality monitoring when required. The Government of Yukon has been operating an outdoor air quality monitoring station in downtown Whitehorse since 2011. In fall 2019, the Government of Yukon started a program with Yukon's Chief Medical Officer of Health and Environment and Climate Change Canada to install small particulate matter sensors called Purple Air sensors.

== See also ==
- Climate change in Canada
- Environmental issues in Canada
- National Ambient Air Quality Objectives for Canada
