= Air Quality Health Index =

Air Quality Health Index (AQHI) is a type of air quality index.

Air Quality Health Index may refer to:

- Air Quality Health Index (Canada)
- Air Quality Health Index (Hong Kong)
