= Air quality index =

Measure of air pollution

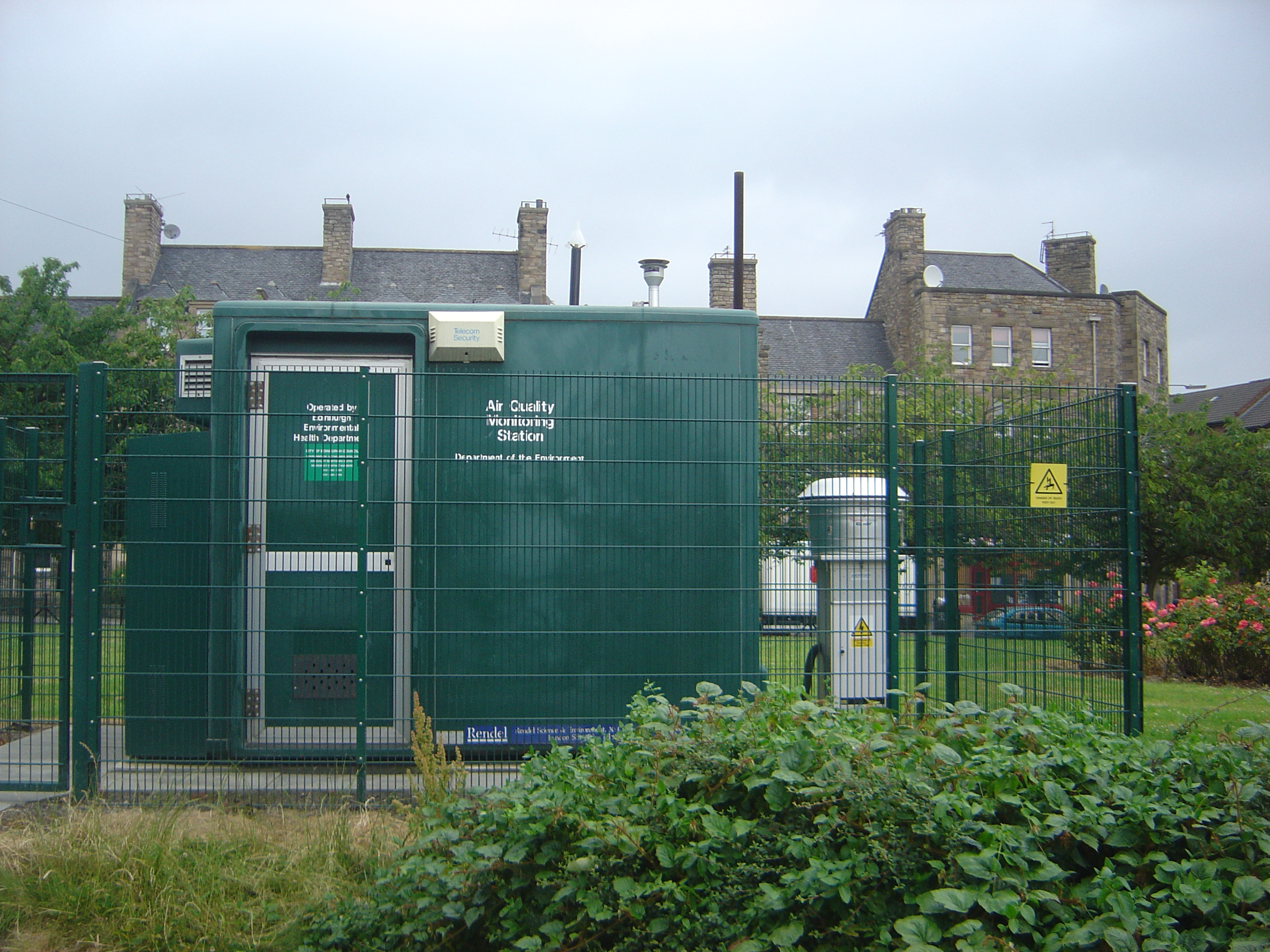
An air quality measurement station in Edinburgh, Scotland

An air quality index (AQI) is an approximation of how polluted the air currently is or how polluted it is forecast to become. As air pollution levels rise, so does the AQI, along with the associated public health risks.

Different countries have their own air quality indices, corresponding to different national air quality standards. These include Canada's Air Quality Health Index, Malaysia's Air Pollution Index, and Singapore's Pollutant Standards Index. The World Health Organization has an Air quality guideline. Pollutants that are commonly monitored include ground-level ozone, particulates, sulfur dioxide, carbon monoxide, and nitrogen dioxide.

Children, the elderly, and individuals with respiratory or cardiovascular problems are typically the first groups affected by poor air quality. When the AQI is high, governmental bodies generally encourage people to reduce physical activity outdoors, or even avoid going out altogether.

== Overview ==
Computation of the AQI requires an air pollutant concentration over a specified averaging period, obtained from an air monitor or model. Taken together, concentration and time represent the dose of the air pollutant. Health effects corresponding to a given dose are established by epidemiological research. Air pollutants vary in potency, and the function used to convert from air pollutant concentration to AQI varies by pollutant. Its air-quality index values are typically grouped into ranges. Each range is assigned a descriptor, a color code, and a standardized public health advisory.

The AQI can increase due to an increase of air emissions. For example, during rush hour traffic, or when there is an upwind forest fire or from a lack of dilution of air pollutants. Stagnant air, often caused by an anticyclone, temperature inversion, or low wind speeds lets air pollution remain in a local area, leading to high concentrations of pollutants, chemical reactions between air contaminants and hazy conditions.

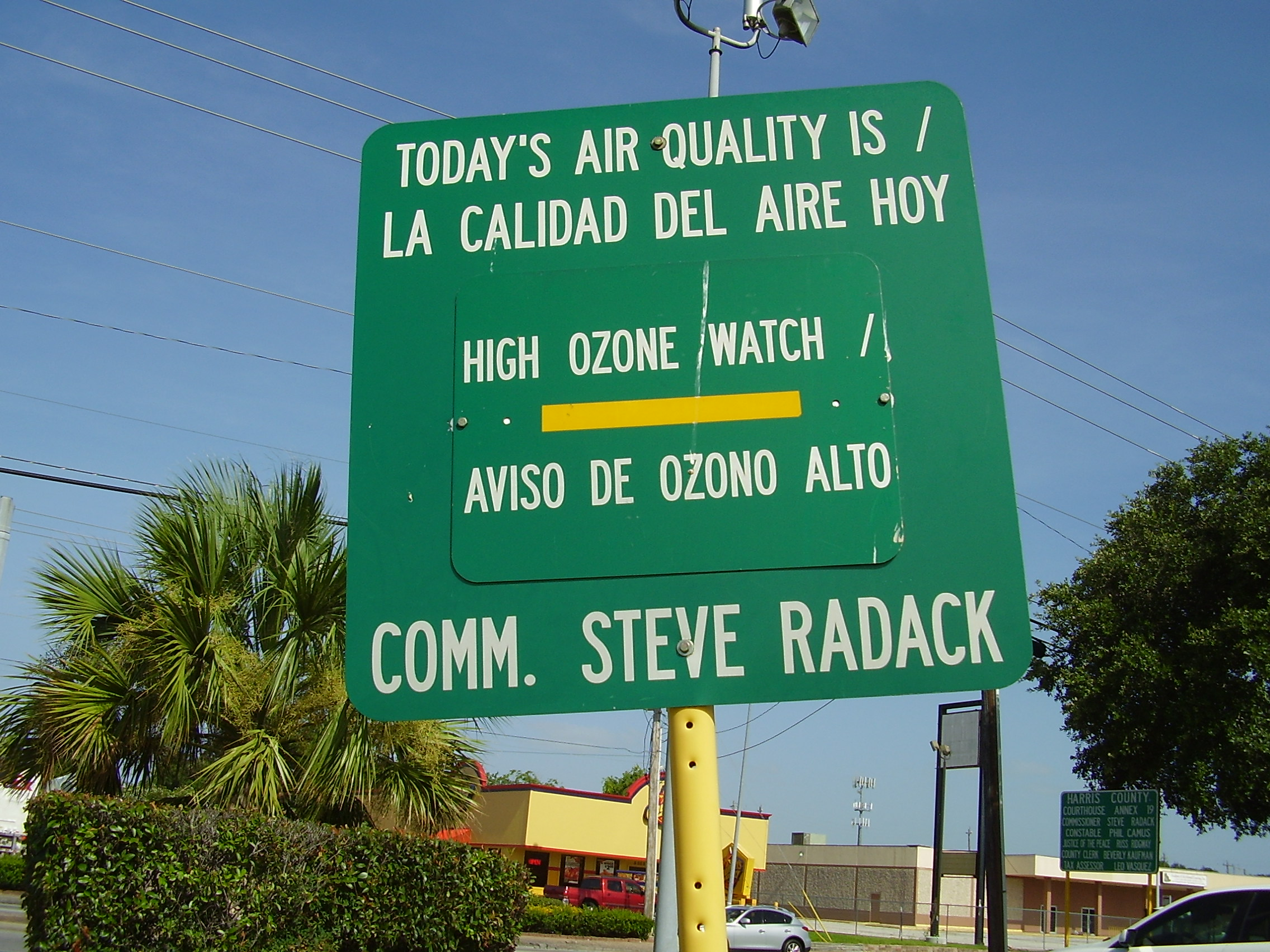
Signboard in Gulfton, Houston, Texas, indicating an ozone watch

On a day when the AQI is predicted to be elevated due to fine particle pollution, an agency or public-health organization might:

- advise sensitive groups, such as the elderly, children, and those with respiratory or cardiovascular problems or suffering from diseases, to avoid outdoor exertion.
- declare an "action day" to encourage voluntary measures to curtail air emissions, such as using public transportation.
- recommend the use of masks outdoors and air purifiers indoors to prevent fine particles from entering the lungs.

During a period of very poor air quality, such as an air-pollution episode, when the AQI indicates that acute exposure may cause significant harm to the public health, agencies may invoke emergency plans that allow them to order major emitters (such as coal burning industries) to curtail emissions until the hazardous conditions abate.

Most air contaminants do not have an associated AQI. Many countries monitor ground-level ozone, particulates, sulfur dioxide, carbon monoxide and, nitrogen dioxide, and calculate air quality indices for these pollutants.

The definition of the AQI in a particular nation reflects the discourse surrounding the development of national air-quality standards in that nation. A website allowing government agencies anywhere in the world to submit their real-time air monitoring data for display using a common definition of the air quality index has recently become available.

== Indices by location ==
=== Australia ===
Each of the states and territories of Australia is responsible for monitoring air-quality and publishing data in accordance with the National Environment Protection (Ambient Air Quality) Measure (NEPM) standards.

Each state and territory publishes air- quality data for individual monitoring locations, and most states and territories publish air -quality indexes for each monitoring location.

Across Australia, a consistent approach is taken with air-quality indexes, using a simple linear scale where 100 represents the maximum concentration standard for each pollutant, as set by the NEPM. These maximum concentration standards are:

| Pollutant | Averaging period | Maximum concentration standard |
|---|---|---|
| Carbon monoxide | 8 hours | 9 ppm |
| Nitrogen dioxide | 1 hour | 0.12 ppm |
| Nitrogen dioxide | 1 year | 0.03 ppm |
| Ozone | 1 hour | 0.10 ppm |
| Ozone | 4 hours | 0.08 ppm |
| Sulfur dioxide | 1 hour | 0.20 ppm |
| Sulfur dioxide | 1 day | 0.08 ppm |
| Sulfur dioxide | 1 year | 0.02 ppm |
| Lead | 1 year | 0.50 μg/m^{3} |
| PM_{10} | 1 day | 50 μg/m^{3} |
| PM_{10} | 1 year | 25 μg/m^{3} |
| PM_{2.5} | 1 day | 25 μg/m^{3} |
| PM_{2.5} | 1 year | 8 μg/m^{3} |

The air quality index (AQI) for an individual location is simply the highest of the air quality index values for each pollutant being monitored at that location.

There are six AQI bands, with health advice for each:

| AQI | Category | Health advice |
|---|---|---|
| 0–33 | Very Good | Enjoy activities |
| 34–66 | Good | Enjoy activities |
| 67–99 | Fair | People unusually sensitive to air pollution: Plan strenuous outdoor activities when air quality is better |
| 100–149 | Poor | Sensitive groups: Cut back or reschedule strenuous outdoor activities |
| 150–200 | Very Poor | Sensitive groups: Avoid strenuous outdoor activities; Everyone: Cut back or reschedule strenuous outdoor activities |
| 200+ | Hazardous | Sensitive groups: Avoid all outdoor physical activities; Everyone: Significantly cut back on outdoor physical activities |

=== Canada ===
Air quality in Canada has been reported for many years with provincial air-quality indices (AQIs). Significantly, AQI values reflect air quality management objectives, which are based on the lowest achievable emissions rate, rather than exclusive concern for human health. The Air Quality Health Index (AQHI) is a scale designed to help understand the effect of air quality on health. It is a health protection tool used to make decisions to reduce short-term exposure to air pollution by adjusting activity levels during increased levels of air pollution. The Air Quality Health Index also provides advice on how to improve air quality by proposing a behavioral change to reduce the environmental footprint. This index pays particular attention to people who are sensitive to air pollution. It provides them with advice on how to protect their health during air quality levels associated with low, moderate, high and very high health risks.

The AQHI provides a number from 1 to 10+ to indicate the level of health risk associated with local air quality. On occasion, when the amount of air pollution is abnormally high, the number may exceed 10. The AQHI provides a local air-quality current value as well as a local air quality maximums forecast for today, tonight, and tomorrow, and provides associated health advice.

| Health risk | Air quality health index | Health messages | |
| Health risk | Air quality health index | At risk population | General population |
|---|---|---|---|
| Low Risk | 1–3 | Enjoy your usual outdoor activities. | Ideal air quality for outdoor activities. |
| Moderate Risk | 4–6 | Consider reducing or rescheduling strenuous activities outdoors if you are experiencing symptoms. | No need to modify your usual outdoor activities unless you experience symptoms such as coughing and throat irritation. |
| High Risk | 7–10 | Reduce or reschedule strenuous activities outdoors. Children and the elderly should also take it easy. | Consider reducing or rescheduling strenuous activities outdoors if you experience symptoms such as coughing and throat irritation. |
| Very High Risk | Above 10 | Avoid strenuous activities outdoors. Children and the elderly should also avoid outdoor physical exertion. | Reduce or reschedule strenuous activities outdoors, especially if you experience symptoms such as coughing and throat irritation. |

=== China ===
==== Hong Kong ====
On December 30, 2013, Hong Kong replaced the Air Pollution Index with a new index called the Air Quality Health Index. This index, reported by the Environmental Protection Department, is measured on a scale of 1 to 10+, and considers four air pollutants: ozone; nitrogen dioxide; sulfur dioxide and particulate matter (including PM10 and PM2.5). For any given hour the AQHI is calculated from the sum of the percentage excess risk of daily hospital admissions attributable to the 3-hour moving average concentrations of these four pollutants. The AQHIs are grouped into five AQHI health risk categories with health advice provided:

| Health Risk | AQHI |
|---|---|
| Low | 1 |
| Low | 2 |
| Low | 3 |
| Moderate | 4 |
| Moderate | 5 |
| Moderate | 6 |
| High | 7 |
| Very High | 8 |
| Very High | 9 |
| Very High | 10 |
| Serious | 10+ |

==== Mainland China ====
China's Ministry of Environmental Protection (MEP) is responsible for measuring the level of air pollution in China. As of January 1, 2013, MEP monitors daily pollution level in 163 of its major cities. The AQI level is based on the level of six atmospheric pollutants, namely sulfur dioxide (SO_{2}), nitrogen dioxide (NO_{2}), suspended particulates smaller than 10 μm in aerodynamic diameter (PM_{10}), suspended particulates smaller than 2.5 μm in aerodynamic diameter (PM_{2.5}), carbon monoxide (CO), and ozone (O_{3}) measured at the monitoring stations throughout each city.

===== AQI mechanics =====
An individual score (Individual Air Quality Index, IAQI) is calculated using breakpoint concentrations below, and using same piecewise linear function to calculate intermediate values as the US AQI scale. and The final AQI value can be calculated either per hour or per 24 hours and is the max of these six scores.

Chinese AQI category and pollutant breakpoints
| IAQI | Units are in μg/m^{3} except CO, which is in mg/m^{3} | | | | | | | | | |
| IAQI | SO_{2}, 24 hour | SO_{2}, 1 hour ^{(1)} | NO_{2}, 24 hour | NO_{2}, 1 hour ^{(1)} | PM_{10}, 24 hour | CO, 24 hour | CO, 1 hour ^{(1)} | O_{3}, 1 hour | O_{3}, 8 hour | PM_{2.5}, 24 hour |
|---|---|---|---|---|---|---|---|---|---|---|
| 0 | 0 | 0 | 0 | 0 | 0 | 0 | 0 | 0 | 0 | 0 |
| 50 | 50 | 150 | 40 | 100 | 50 | 2 | 5 | 160 | 100 | 35 |
| 100 | 150 | 500 | 80 | 200 | 150 | 4 | 10 | 200 | 160 | 75 |
| 150 | 475 | 650 | 180 | 700 | 250 | 14 | 35 | 300 | 215 | 115 |
| 200 | 800 | 800 | 280 | 1200 | 350 | 24 | 60 | 400 | 265 | 150 |
| 300 | 1600 | ^{(2)} | 565 | 2340 | 420 | 36 | 90 | 800 | 800 | 250 |
| 400 | 2100 | ^{(2)} | 750 | 3090 | 500 | 48 | 120 | 1000 | ^{(3)} | 350 |
| 500 | 2620 | ^{(2)} | 940 | 3840 | 600 | 60 | 150 | 1200 | ^{(3)} | 500 |

The score for each pollutant is non-linear, as is the final AQI score. Thus an AQI of 300 does not mean twice the pollution of AQI at 150, nor does it mean the air is twice as harmful. The concentration of a pollutant when its IAQI is 100 does not equal twice its concentration when its IAQI is 50, nor does it mean the pollutant is twice as harmful.

While an AQI of 50 from day 1 to 182 and AQI of 100 from day 183 to 365 does provide an annual average of 75, it does not mean the pollution is acceptable even if the benchmark of 100 is deemed safe. Because the benchmark is a 24-hour target, and the annual average must match the annual target, it is entirely possible to have safe air every day of the year but still fail the annual pollution benchmark.

AQI and health implications (HJ 633–2012)
| AQI | Air Pollution Level | Air Pollution Category | Health Implications | Recommended Precautions |
|---|---|---|---|---|
| 0–50 | Level 1 | Excellent | No health implications. | Everyone can continue their outdoor activities normally because the air is not polluted. |
| 51–100 | Level 2 | Good | Some pollutants may slightly affect very few hypersensitive individuals. | Only very few hypersensitive people should reduce outdoor activities. |
| 101–150 | Level 3 | Lightly Polluted | Healthy people may experience slight irritations and sensitive individuals will be slightly affected to a larger extent because the air is slightly polluted. | Children, seniors and individuals suffering respiratory or heart diseases should reduce sustained and high-intensity outdoor exercises. |
| 151–200 | Level 4 | Moderately Polluted | Sensitive individuals will experience more serious conditions because the air is moderately polluted. The hearts and respiratory systems of healthy people may be affected. | Children, seniors and individuals with respiratory or heart diseases should avoid sustained and high-intensity outdoor exercises. General population should moderately reduce outdoor activities. |
| 201–300 | Level 5 | Heavily Polluted | Healthy people will commonly show symptoms. People suffering from respiratory or heart diseases will be seriously affected and will experience reduced endurance in activities. | Children, seniors and individuals with heart or lung diseases should stay indoors and avoid outdoor activities. General population should reduce outdoor activities. |
| 301–500 | Level 6 | Severely Polluted | Healthy people will experience reduced endurance in activities and may also show noticeably strong symptoms. Other illnesses may be triggered in healthy people. Seniors and those suffering from diseases should remain indoors and avoid exercise. Healthy individuals should avoid outdoor activities because the air is severely polluted. | Children, seniors and the sick should stay indoors and avoid physical exertion. General population should avoid outdoor activities. |

=== Europe ===
The Common Air Quality Index (CAQI) is an air quality index used in Europe since 2006. In November 2017, the European Environment Agency announced the European Air Quality Index (EAQI) and started encouraging its use on websites and for other ways of informing the public about air quality.

==== CAQI ====
As of 2012, the EU-supported project CiteairII argued that the CAQI had been evaluated on a "large set" of data, and described the CAQI's motivation and definition. CiteairII stated that having an air quality index that would be easy to present to the general public was a major motivation, leaving aside the more complex question of a health-based index, which would require, for example, effects of combined levels of different pollutants. The main aim of the CAQI was to have an index that would encourage wide comparison across the EU, without replacing local indices. CiteairII stated that the "main goal of the CAQI is not to warn people for possible adverse health effects of poor air quality but to attract their attention to urban air pollution and its main source (traffic) and help them decrease their exposure."

The CAQI is a number on a scale from 0 to 100, where a low value means good air quality and a high value means poor air quality. The index is defined in both hourly and daily versions, and separately near roads (a "roadside" or "traffic" index) or away from roads (a "background" index). As of 2012, the CAQI had two mandatory components for the roadside index, NO_{2} and PM_{10}, and three mandatory components for the background index, NO_{2}, PM_{10} and O_{3}. It also included optional pollutants PM_{2.5}, CO and SO_{2}. A "sub-index" is calculated for each of the mandatory (and optional if available) components. The CAQI is defined as the sub-index that represents the worst quality among those components.

Some of the key pollutant concentrations in μg/m^{3} for the hourly background index, the corresponding sub-indices, and five CAQI ranges and verbal descriptions are as follows.

| Qualitative name | Index or sub-index | Pollutant (hourly) concentration in μg/m^{3} | | | |
| Qualitative name | Index or sub-index | NO_{2} μg/m^{3} | PM_{10} | O_{3} μg/m^{3} | PM_{2.5} (optional) μg/m^{3} |
|---|---|---|---|---|---|
| Very low | 0–25 | 0–50 | 0–25 | 0–60 | 0–15 |
| Low | 25–50 | 50–100 | 25–50 | 60–120 | 15–30 |
| Medium | 50–75 | 100–200 | 50–90 | 120–180 | 30–55 |
| High | 75–100 | 200–400 | 90–180 | 180–240 | 55–110 |
| Very high | >100 | >400 | >180 | >240 | >110 |

Frequently updated CAQI values and maps are shown on www.airqualitynow.eu and other websites. A separate Year Average Common Air Quality Index (YACAQI) is also defined, in which different pollutant sub-indices are separately normalised to a value typically near unity. For example, the yearly averages of NO_{2}, PM_{10} and PM_{2.5} are divided by 40 μg/m^{3}, 40 μg/m^{3} and 20 μg/m^{3}, respectively. The overall background or traffic YACAQI for a city is the arithmetic mean of a defined subset of these sub-indices.

=== India ===
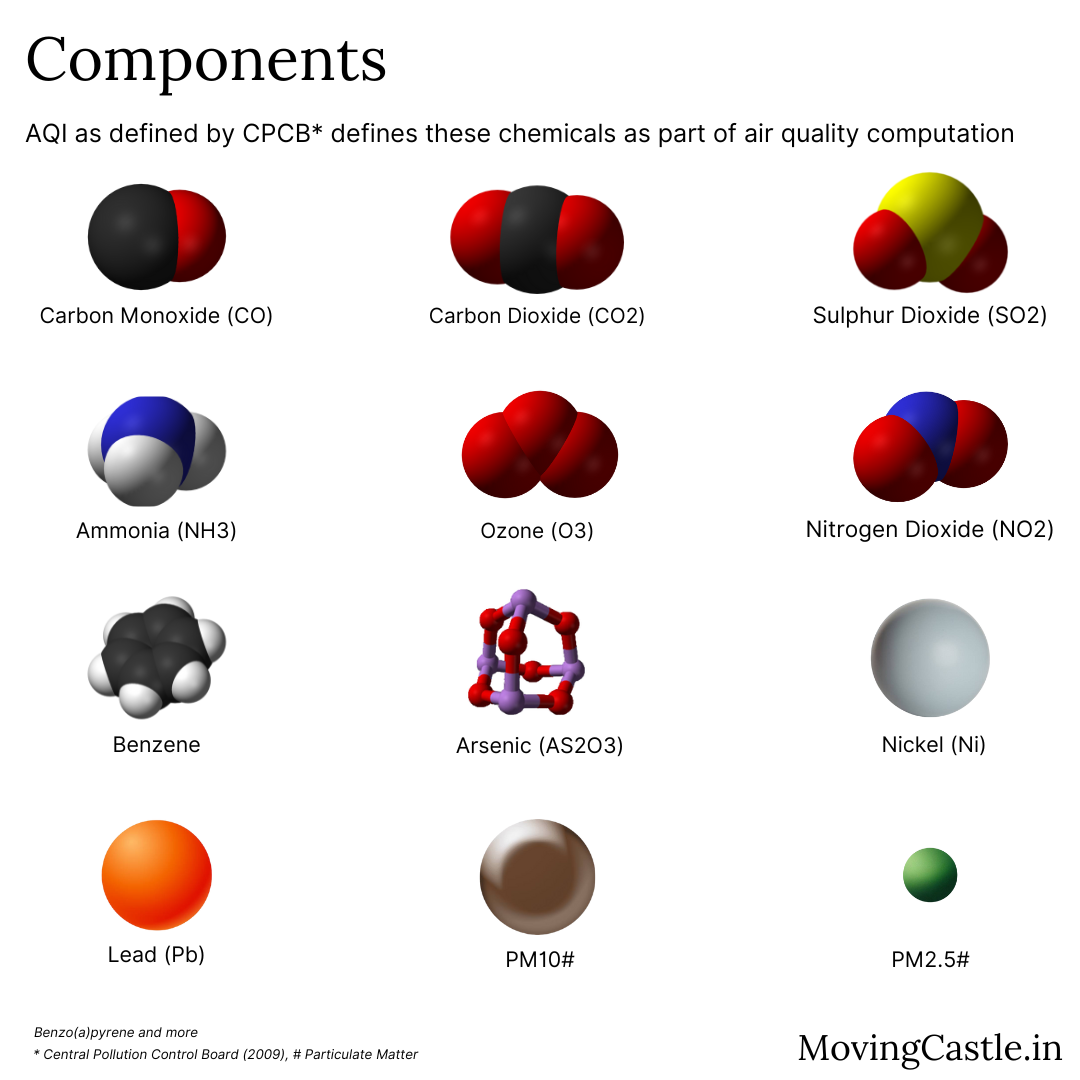
Components of India's National Air Quality Index (NAQI)

The National Air Quality Index (NAQI) was launched in New Delhi on 17 September 2014, under the Swachh Bharat Abhiyan.

The Central Pollution Control Board along with State Pollution Control Boards has been operating National Air Monitoring Programme (NAMP) covering 240 cities of the country, with more than 342 monitoring stations. An Expert Group comprising medical professionals, air quality experts, academia, advocacy groups, and SPCBs was constituted and a technical study was awarded to IIT Kanpur. IIT Kanpur and the Expert Group recommended an AQI scheme in 2014. While the earlier measuring index was limited to three indicators, the new index measures eight parameters. The continuous monitoring systems that provide data on near real-time basis are installed in New Delhi, Mumbai, Pune, Kolkata and Ahmedabad.

There are six NAQI categories, namely Good, Satisfactory, Moderate, Poor, Severe and Hazardous. The proposed NAQI will consider eight pollutants PM_{10}, PM_{2.5}, NO_{2}, SO_{2}, CO, O_{3}, NH_{3}, and Pb) for which short-term (up to 24-hourly averaging period) National Ambient Air Quality Standards are prescribed. Based on the measured ambient concentrations, corresponding standards and likely health effects, a sub-index is calculated for each of these pollutants. The worst sub-index reflects overall NAQI. Likely health effects for different NAQI categories and pollutants have also been suggested, with primary inputs from the medical experts in the group. The NAQI values and corresponding ambient concentrations (health breakpoints) as well as associated likely health effects for the identified eight pollutants are as follows:

| AQI Category (Range) | PM_{10} 24-hr | PM_{2.5} 24-hr | NO_{2} 24-hr | O_{3} 8-hr | CO 8-hr (mg/m^{3}) | SO_{2} 24-hr | NH_{3} 24-hr | Pb 24-hr |
|---|---|---|---|---|---|---|---|---|
| Good (0–50) | 0–50 | 0–30 | 0–40 | 0–50 | 0–1.0 | 0–40 | 0–200 | 0–0.5 |
| Satisfactory (51–100) | 51–100 | 31–60 | 41–80 | 51–100 | 1.1–2.0 | 41–80 | 201–400 | 0.6–1.0 |
| Moderate (101–200) | 101–250 | 61–90 | 81–180 | 101–168 | 2.1–10 | 81–380 | 401–800 | 1.1–2.0 |
| Poor (201–300) | 251–350 | 91–120 | 181–280 | 169–208 | 10.1–17 | 381–800 | 801–1200 | 2.1–3.0 |
| Severe (301–400) | 351–430 | 121–250 | 281–400 | 209–748* | 17–34 | 801–1600 | 1200–1800 | 3.1–3.5 |
| Hazardous (401–500) | 430+ | 250+ | 400+ | 748+* | 34+ | 1600+ | 1800+ | 3.5+ |

| AQI | Remark | Colour Code | Possible Health Effects |
|---|---|---|---|
| 0–50 | Good | | Minimal effect |
| 51–100 | Satisfactory | | Minor breathing discomfort to sensitive people |
| 101–200 | Moderate | | Breathing discomfort to the people with lungs, asthma and heart diseases |
| 201–300 | Poor | | Breathing discomfort to most people on prolonged exposure |
| 301–400 | Severe | | Respiratory illness on prolonged exposure |
| 401–500 | Hazardous | | Affects healthy people and seriously affects those with existing diseases |

=== Japan ===
According to Japan Weather Association, Japan uses a different scale to measure the air quality index.

| CAI | Description | Health Implications |
|---|---|---|
| 0–50 | Good (良い) | There is no effect on humans. Outdoor activities are always allowed. |
| 51–100 | Moderate (適度) | Outdoor activities are often allowed because air is seldom considered unhealthy. |
| 101–200 | Unhealthy (不健康) | Outdoor activities are sometimes allowed because air is sometimes considered unhealthy. |
| 201–350 | Very unhealthy (非常不健康) | There are serious health hazards. Outdoor activities are seldom allowed. |
| 351–500 | Hazardous (危険な) | Pollutants trigger extremely serious health hazards to humans. Outdoor activities are never allowed. |

=== Mexico ===
The air quality in Mexico City is reported in IMECAs. The IMECA is calculated using the measurements of average times of the chemicals ozone (O_{3}), sulfur dioxide (SO_{2}), nitrogen dioxide (NO_{2}), carbon monoxide (CO), particles smaller than 2.5 micrometers (PM_{2.5}), and particles smaller than 10 micrometers (PM_{10}).

=== Singapore ===
Singapore uses the Pollutant Standards Index to report on its air quality, with details of the calculation similar but not identical to those used in Malaysia and Hong Kong. The PSI chart below is grouped by index values and descriptors, according to the National Environment Agency.

| PSI | Category | Healthy Persons | Elderly, Pregnant Women, Children | Persons with Chronic Lung Disease or Heart Disease |
|---|---|---|---|---|
| 0–50 | Good | Normal activities | Normal activities | Normal activities |
| 51–100 | Moderate | Normal activities | Normal activities | Normal activities |
| 101–200 | Unhealthy | Reduce prolonged or strenuous outdoor physical exertion | Minimise prolonged or strenuous outdoor physical exertion | Avoid prolonged or strenuous outdoor physical exertion |
| 201–300 | Very Unhealthy | Avoid prolonged or strenuous outdoor physical exertion | Minimise outdoor activity | Avoid outdoor activity |
| 301–500 | Hazardous | Minimise outdoor activity | Avoid outdoor activity | Avoid outdoor activity |

=== South Korea ===
The Ministry of Environment of South Korea uses the Comprehensive Air-quality Index (CAI) to describe the ambient air quality based on the health risks of air pollution. The index aims to help the public easily understand the air quality and protect people's health. The CAI is on a scale from 0 to 500, which is divided into six categories. The higher the CAI value, the greater the level of air pollution. Of values of the five air pollutants, the highest is the CAI value. The index also has associated health effects and a colour representation of the categories as shown below.

| CAI | Description | Health Effects |
|---|---|---|
| 0–50 | Good | A level that will not affect patients suffering from diseases related to air pollution |
| 51–100 | Moderate | A level which may have a meager effect on patients in case of chronic exposure |
| 101–250 | Unhealthy | A level that may have harmful effects on patients and members of sensitive groups (children, aged or weak people), and also cause the general public unpleasant feelings |
| 251–500 | Very unhealthy | A level which may have serious effects on patients and members of sensitive groups in case of acute exposure |

The N Seoul Tower on Namsan Mountain in central Seoul, South Korea, is illuminated in blue, from sunset to 23:00 and 22:00 in winter, on days where the air quality in Seoul is 45 or less. During the spring of 2012, the Tower was lit up for 52 days, which is four days more than in 2011.

=== United Kingdom ===
The most commonly used air quality index in the UK is the Daily Air Quality Index recommended by the Committee on the Medical Effects of Air Pollutants (COMEAP). This index has ten points, which are further grouped into four bands: low, moderate, high and very high. Each of the bands comes with advice for at-risk groups and the general population.

| Air Pollution Banding | Value | Accompanying health messages for at-risk individuals | Accompanying health messages for the general population |
|---|---|---|---|
| Low | 1–3 | Enjoy your usual outdoor activities. | Enjoy your usual outdoor activities. |
| Moderate | 4–6 | Adults and children with lung problems, and adults with heart problems, who experience symptoms, should consider reducing strenuous physical activity, particularly outdoors. | Enjoy your usual outdoor activities. |
| High | 7–9 | Adults and children with lung problems, and adults with heart problems, should reduce strenuous physical exertion, particularly outdoors, and particularly if they experience symptoms. People with asthma may find they need to use their reliever inhalator more often. Older people should also reduce physical exertion. | Anyone experiencing discomfort such as sore eyes, cough or sore throat, should consider reducing activity, particularly outdoors. |
| Very High | 10 | Adults and children with lung problems, adults with heart problems, and older people, should avoid strenuous physical activity. People with asthma may find they need to use their reliever inhaler more often. | Reduce physical exertion, particularly outdoors, especially if you experience symptoms such as cough or sore throat. |

The index is based on the concentrations of five pollutants. The index is calculated from the concentrations of the following pollutants: ozone, nitrogen dioxide, sulfur dioxide, PM2.5 and PM10. The breakpoints between index values are defined for each pollutant separately and the overall index is defined as the maximum value of the index. Different averaging periods are used for different pollutants.

| Index | Ozone, running 8 hourly mean (μg/m^{3}) | Nitrogen dioxide, hourly mean (μg/m^{3}) | Sulfur dioxide, 15 minute mean (μg/m^{3}) | PM_{2.5} particles, 24 hour mean (μg/m^{3}) | PM_{10} particles, 24 hour mean (μg/m^{3}) |
|---|---|---|---|---|---|
| 1 | 0–33 | 0–67 | 0–88 | 0–11 | 0–16 |
| 2 | 34–66 | 68–134 | 89–177 | 12–23 | 17–33 |
| 3 | 67–100 | 135–200 | 178–266 | 24–35 | 34–50 |
| 4 | 101–120 | 201–267 | 267–354 | 36–41 | 51–58 |
| 5 | 121–140 | 268–334 | 355–443 | 42–47 | 59–66 |
| 6 | 141–160 | 335–400 | 444–532 | 48–53 | 67–75 |
| 7 | 161–187 | 401–467 | 533–710 | 54–58 | 76–83 |
| 8 | 188–213 | 468–534 | 711–887 | 59–64 | 84–91 |
| 9 | 214–240 | 535–600 | 888–1064 | 65–70 | 92–100 |
| 10 | ≥ 241 | ≥ 601 | ≥ 1065 | ≥ 71 | ≥ 101 |

=== United States ===
| AQI | Category | Color | Health implications | What should people do |
|---|---|---|---|---|
| 0–50 | Good | Green | Air quality is considered satisfactory, and air pollution poses little or no risk. | It's a great day to be active outside. |
| 51–100 | Moderate | Yellow | Air quality is acceptable; however, for some pollutants there may be a moderate health concern for a very small number of people who are unusually sensitive to air pollution. | Unusually sensitive people: Consider reducing prolonged or heavy exertion. Watch for symptoms such as coughing or shortness of breath. These are signs to take it easier. Everyone else: It's a good day to be active outside. |
| 101–150 | Unhealthy for Sensitive Groups | Orange | Members of sensitive groups may experience health effects. The general public is not likely to be affected. | Sensitive groups: Reduce prolonged or heavy exertion. It's OK to be active outside, but take more breaks and do less intense activities. Watch for symptoms such as coughing or shortness of breath. People with asthma should follow their asthma action plans and keep quick relief medicine handy. If you have heart disease: Symptoms such as palpitations, shortness of breath, or unusual fatigue may indicate a serious problem. If you have any of these, contact your health care provider. |
| 151–200 | Unhealthy | Red | Everyone may begin to experience health effects; members of sensitive groups may experience more serious health effects. | Sensitive groups: Avoid prolonged or heavy exertion. Move activities indoors or reschedule to a time when the air quality is better. Everyone else: Reduce prolonged or heavy exertion. Take more breaks during all outdoor activities. |
| 201–300 | Very Unhealthy | Purple | Health alert: everyone may experience more serious health effects. | Sensitive groups: Avoid all physical activity outdoors. Move activities indoors or reschedule to a time when air quality is better. Everyone else: Avoid prolonged or heavy exertion. Consider moving activities indoors or rescheduling to a time when air quality is better. |
| 301+ | Hazardous | Maroon | Health warnings of emergency conditions. The entire population is more likely to be affected. | Everyone: Avoid all physical activity outdoors. Sensitive groups: Remain indoors and keep activity levels low. Follow tips for keeping particle levels low indoors. |

PM_{2.5} 24-Hour AQI Loop, Courtesy US EPA

The United States Environmental Protection Agency (EPA) has developed an Air Quality Index that is used to report air quality. An AQI value over 300 represents hazardous air quality and below 50 the air quality is good. This AQI is divided into six categories indicating increasing levels of health concern.

The AQI is based on the five "criteria" pollutants regulated under the Clean Air Act: ground-level ozone, particulate matter, carbon monoxide, sulfur dioxide, and nitrogen dioxide. The EPA has established National Ambient Air Quality Standards (NAAQS) for each of these pollutants in order to protect public health. An AQI value of 100 generally corresponds to the level of the NAAQS for the pollutant. The Clean Air Act (USA) (1990) requires the EPA to review its National Ambient Air Quality Standards every five years to reflect evolving health effects information. The Air Quality Index is adjusted periodically to reflect these changes.

==== EPA Breakpoints ====
The EPA's table of breakpoints is:

| O_{3} (ppb) 8-hr | O_{3} (ppb) 1-hr | PM_{2.5} (μg/m^{3}) 24-hr | PM_{10} (μg/m^{3}) 24-hr | CO (ppm) 8-hr | SO_{2} (ppb) 1-hr; 24-hr | NO_{2} (ppb) 1-hr | AQI | AQI category |
|---|---|---|---|---|---|---|---|---|
| 0–54 | — | 0.0–9.0 | 0–54 | 0.0–4.4 | 0–35 | 0–53 | 0–50 | Good |
| 55–70 | — | 9.1–35.4 | 55–154 | 4.5–9.4 | 36–75 | 54–100 | 51–100 | Moderate |
| 71–85 | 125–164 | 35.5–55.4 | 155–254 | 9.5–12.4 | 76–185 | 101–360 | 101–150 | Unhealthy for Sensitive Groups |
| 86–105 | 165–204 | 55.5–125.4 | 255–354 | 12.5–15.4 | 186–304 | 361–649 | 151–200 | Unhealthy |
| 106–200 | 205–404 | 125.5–225.4 | 355–424 | 15.5–30.4 | 305–604 | 650–1249 | 201–300 | Very Unhealthy |
| — | 405–604 | 225.5–325.4 | 425–604 | 30.5–50.4 | 605–1004 | 1250–2049 | 301–500 | Hazardous |

To convert an air pollutant concentration to an AQI, EPA has developed a calculator.

If multiple pollutants are measured at a monitoring site, then the largest or "dominant" AQI value is reported for the location. The ozone AQI between 100 and 300 is computed by selecting the larger of the AQI computed with a 1-hour ozone value and the AQI computed with the 8-hour ozone value.

Eight-hour ozone averages do not define AQI values greater than 300; AQI values of 301 or greater are calculated with 1-hour ozone concentrations. 1-hour SO_{2} values do not define higher AQI values greater than 200. AQI values of 201 or greater are calculated with 24-hour SO_{2} concentrations.

Real-time monitoring data from continuous monitors are typically available as 1-hour averages. However, computation of the AQI for some pollutants requires averaging over multiple hours of data. (For example, calculation of the ozone AQI requires computation of an 8-hour average and computation of the PM_{2.5} or PM_{10} AQI requires a 24-hour average.) To accurately reflect the current air quality, the multi-hour average used for the AQI computation should be centered on the current time, but as concentrations of future hours are unknown and are difficult to estimate accurately, EPA uses surrogate concentrations to estimate these multi-hour averages. For reporting the PM_{2.5}, PM_{10} and ozone air quality indices, this surrogate concentration is called the NowCast. The Nowcast is a particular type of weighted average that provides more weight to the most recent air quality data when air pollution levels are changing.

==== Public availability of the AQI ====
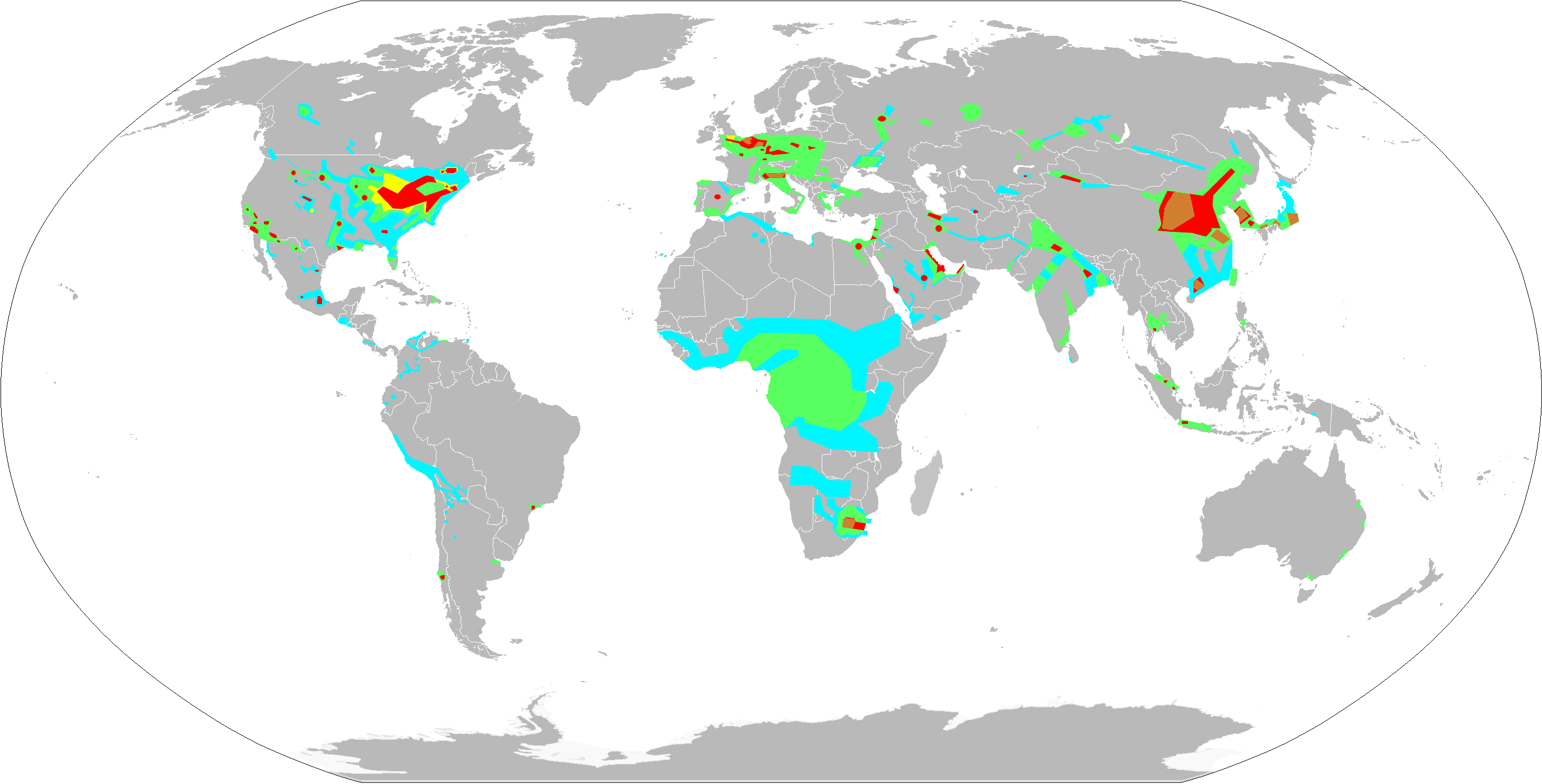
A global air quality map

Real time monitoring data and forecasts of air quality that are color-coded in terms of the air quality index are available from EPA's AirNow web site. Other organizations provide monitoring for members of sensitive groups such as asthmatics, children and adults over the age of 65. Historical air monitoring data including AQI charts and maps are available at EPA's AirData website. There is a free email subscription service for New York inhabitants – AirNYC. Subscribers get notifications about the changes in the AQI values for the selected location (e.g. home address), based on air quality conditions. A detailed map containing current AQI levels and a two-day AQI forecast is available at the Aerostate web site.

==== Regulatory Air Monitors and Low Cost Sensors ====
Historically, EPA has only allowed data from regulatory monitors operated by regulatory or public health professionals to be included in its real time national maps. In the past decade, low cost sensors (LCS's) have become increasingly popular with citizen scientists, and large LCS networks have sprung up in the US and across the globe. Recently, EPA has developed a data correction algorithm for a particular brand of PM_{2.5} LCS that makes the LCS data comparable to regulatory data for the purpose of computing the AQI. This corrected LCS data currently appears alongside regulatory data on EPA's national fire map.

==== History of the AQI ====
The AQI made its debut in 1968, when the National Air Pollution Control Administration undertook an initiative to develop an air quality index and to apply the methodology to Metropolitan Statistical Areas. The impetus was to draw public attention to the issue of air pollution and indirectly push responsible local public officials to take action to control sources of pollution and enhance air quality within their jurisdictions.

Jack Fensterstock, the head of the National Inventory of Air Pollution Emissions and Control Branch, was tasked to lead the development of the methodology and to compile the air quality and emissions data necessary to test and calibrate resultant indices.

The initial iteration of the air quality index used standardized ambient pollutant concentrations to yield individual pollutant indices. These indices were then weighted and summed to form a single total air quality index. The overall methodology could use concentrations that are taken from ambient monitoring data or are predicted by means of a diffusion model. The concentrations were then converted into a standard statistical distribution with a preset mean and standard deviation. The resultant individual pollutant indices are assumed to be equally weighted, although values other than unity can be used. Likewise, the index can incorporate any number of pollutants although it was only used to combine SO_{x}, CO, and TSP because of a lack of available data for other pollutants.

While the methodology was designed to be robust, the practical application for all metropolitan areas proved to be inconsistent due to the paucity of ambient air quality monitoring data, lack of agreement on weighting factors, and non-uniformity of air quality standards across geographical and political boundaries. Despite these issues, the publication of lists ranking metropolitan areas achieved the public policy objectives and led to the future development of improved indices and their routine application.

=== Vietnam ===
On November 12, 2019, Vietnam Environment Administration issued Decision No. 1459/QD-TCMT on promulgating Technical Guidelines for calculation and publication of Vietnam Air Quality Index (VN_AQI).

| AQI | Air quality | Color |
|---|---|---|
| 0–50 | Good (Tốt) | Green |
| 51–100 | Average (Trung bình) | Yellow |
| 101–150 | Poor (Kém) | Orange |
| 151–200 | Bad (Xấu) | Red |
| 201–300 | Very Bad (Rất xấu) | Purple |
| 301–500 | Hazardous (Nguy hại) | Maroon |

== See also ==
- Air pollution
- Air pollution forecasting
- Air pollution measurement
- Clean air zone
- Indoor air quality
- Low emission zone
- Ultra Low Emission Zone
