= Stagnation =

Stagnation may refer to:

- Economic stagnation, slow or no economic growth
- Era of Stagnation, a period of economic stagnation in the Soviet Union
- Lost Decades, a period of economic stagnation in Japan
- Stagnation point, in fluid dynamics
- Water stagnation
- Air stagnation
- "Stagnation", a song by Genesis from Trespass
