= JWA (disambiguation) =

JWA is John Wayne Airport in California, United States.

JWA may also refer to:

== Businesses ==
- Japan Pro Wrestling Alliance (1953–1973)
- Japan Weather Association
- John Wardle Architects, an Australian firm
- Johnson Outdoors, an American manufacturer (formerly Johnson Wax/Worldwide Associates)
- J.W. Automotive Engineering Ltd, John Wyer's English racecar maker

== Other uses ==
- Jewish Women's Archive, American non-profit (founded 1995)
- Jwaneng Airport, Botswana (IATA code: JWA)
- JSON Web Algorithms, in Javascript programming; see JSON Web Token
