= USG =

USG may refer to:

== Business ==
- Unix Systems Group, a former division of Novell
- USG Corporation (formerly United States Gypsum Corporation), a construction materials manufacturer
- U.S. Gauge, a division of Ametek, manufacturer of pressure and temperature measurement products

== Education ==
- University System of Georgia, United States
- Universities at Shady Grove, in Rockville, Maryland, United States

== Music ==
- U.S.G., a hip hop collective from Stonebridge, London, see K Koke
- Unison Square Garden, a Japanese band
- Urban Sound Gallery, Brooklyn based music collaboration, see Ron Trent

== Technology ==
- Medical ultrasonography, a diagnostic imaging technique
- Urine specific gravity, a measure of urine concentration or relative density

== Other uses ==
- Ulysses S. Grant (1822–1885), US president and army general
- Under-Secretary-General of the United Nations, UN senior official
- Unhealthy for Sensitive Groups, one of NowCast air quality levels
- Union Saint-Gilloise, a Belgian professional football club
- United States Government
- United States Guards, World War I era US National army formation
- USgamer, a video game news website owned by Gamer Network
- Five-seven USG (United States Government), variant of the FN Five-seven
