= Air Quality Health Index (Canada) =

Air pollution index used in Canada

Air Quality Health Index La Cote air santé
- Formation: 2005
- Headquarters: Ottawa, Ontario, Canada
- Minister of the Environment, Climate Change and Nature: Julie Dabrusin
- Website: www.canada.ca/en/environment-climate-change/services/air-quality-health-index.html

The Air Quality Health Index (AQHI) is a scale designed in Canada to help understand the impact of air quality on health. It is a health protection tool used to make decisions to reduce short-term exposure to air pollution by adjusting activity levels during increased levels of air pollution. The Air Quality Health Index also provides advice on how to improve air quality by proposing behavioral change to reduce the environmental footprint. This index pays particular attention to people who are sensitive to air pollution. It provides them with advice on how to protect their health during air quality levels associated with low, moderate, high and very high health risks.

== History ==
Air quality in Canada has historically been reported by the US Air Quality Index in various provinces. Significantly, AQI values reflect air quality management objectives, which are based on the lowest achievable emissions rate, and not exclusively concern for human health. The AQHI was created with a different goal - to report on the specific health risks posed by air pollution. As such, the AQHI represents a paradigm shift in communicating air quality information to the public.

The Air Quality Health Index (AQHI) is a federal program jointly coordinated by Health Canada and Environment Canada. However, the AQHI program would not be possible without the commitment and support of the provinces, municipalities and NGOs. From air quality monitoring to health risk communication and community engagement, local partners are responsible for the vast majority of work related to AQHI implementation.

The AQHI has been rolled out across Canada and has replaced the AQI as the public face of air quality information.

Originally launched as a pilot project in the British Columbia Interior in 2005 followed by Nova Scotia in 2006 and Toronto in 2007, as of 2016 it was implemented in 122 locations across Canada.

== Overview ==
The Air Quality Health Index provides a number from 1 to 10+ to indicate the level of health risk associated with local air quality. Occasionally, when the amount of air pollution is abnormally high, the number may exceed 10. The AQHI provides a local air quality current value as well as a local air quality maximums forecast for today, tonight and tomorrow and provides associated health advice.

1	2	3	4	5	6	7	8	9	10	+

Risk:	Low (1-3)	Moderate (4-6)	High (7-10)	Very high (above 10)

As it is now known that even low levels of air pollution can trigger discomfort for the sensitive population, the index has been developed as a continuum: The higher the number, the greater the health risk and need to take precautions. The index describes the level of health risk associated with this number as 'low', 'moderate', 'high' or 'very high', and suggests steps that can be taken to reduce exposure.

Health risk	Air Quality Health Index	Health messages	
Health risk	Air Quality Health Index	At risk population	General population
Low	1–3	Enjoy your usual outdoor activities.	Ideal air quality for outdoor activities
Moderate	4–6	Consider reducing or rescheduling strenuous activities outdoors if you are experiencing symptoms.	No need to modify your usual outdoor activities unless you experience symptoms such as coughing and throat irritation.
High	7–10	Reduce or reschedule strenuous activities outdoors. Children and the elderly should also take it easy.	Consider reducing or rescheduling strenuous activities outdoors if you experience symptoms such as coughing and throat irritation.
Very high	Above 10	Avoid strenuous activities outdoors. Children and the elderly should also avoid outdoor physical exertion and should stay indoors.	Reduce or reschedule strenuous activities outdoors, especially if you experience symptoms such as coughing and throat irritation.

== Formula inputs ==
The formulation of the national AQHI is based on the observed relationship of nitrogen dioxide (NO_{2}), ground-level ozone (O_{3}) and fine particulate matter (PM_{2.5}) with mortality from an analysis of several Canadian cities. Significantly, all three of these pollutants can pose health risks, even at low levels of exposure, especially among those with pre-existing health problems.

When developing the AQHI, Health Canada's original analysis of health effects included five major air pollutants: airborne particulate matter, ozone, and nitrogen dioxide (NO_{2}), as well as sulphur dioxide (SO_{2}), and carbon monoxide (CO). The latter two pollutants provided little information in predicting health effects and were removed from the AQHI formulation. During wildfire events, the formula is updated to only include fine particulate matter (PM2.5).

The AQHI does not measure the effects of odour, pollen, dust, heat or humidity.

== Calculation ==
The measurement is based on the observed relationship of nitrogen dioxide (NO_{2}), ground-level ozone (O_{3}) and particulates (PM_{2.5}) with mortality, from an analysis of several Canadian cities. Significantly, all three of these pollutants can pose health risks, even at low levels of exposure, especially among those with pre-existing health problems.

The national AQHI is based on three-hour average concentrations of ground-level ozone (O_{3}), nitrogen dioxide (NO_{2}), and fine particulate matter (PM2.5). O_{3} and NO_{2} are measured in parts per billion (ppb) while PM2.5 is measured in micrograms per cubic metre (μg/m^{3}).

The AQHI is calculated on a community basis (each community may have one or more monitoring stations).

First, the average concentration of the three substances (O_{3}, NO_{2}, PM2.5) is calculated at each station within a community for the 3 preceding hours. This is considered valid only if at least 2 out of 3 hours are available at the station. If more than 1 of the preceding 3 hours is missing the station average is set to "Not Available". This part of the process results in three "station parameter averages" for each station.

Second, the 3 hour "community average" for each parameter is calculated from the 3 hour substance averages at the available stations. If no stations are available for a parameter, that parameter is set to "Not Available". This part of the process results in three community parameter averages.

Third, if all three community parameter averages are available, a community AQHI is calculated. The formula is:

$AQHI=(\frac{10}{10.4})\times 100\times [(e^{0.000537\times O_3}-1)+(e^{0.000871\times NO_2}-1)+(e^{0.000487\times PM_{2.5}}-1)]$

The result is then rounded to the nearest whole number.

== Alberta calculation and reporting differences ==
Alberta has modified AQHI reporting to better suit the needs of the Province. Because of Alberta's energy based economy other pollutants are also considered when reporting the AQHI.

Alberta also has rapidly changing air quality conditions quite often (for example during wildfire season) so, Alberta's AQHI needs to be more responsive than the national AQHI, which is based on a three-hour average.

In order to meet these needs, the individual pollutant concentrations are compared to Alberta's Ambient Air Quality Objectives (AAQOs). The national AQHI is used most of the time; however, if hourly air pollutant concentrations are higher than Alberta's AAQOs, the AQHI value is replaced (overridden) with the appropriate "High" or "Very High" risk value. This can occur for the following pollutants (when they exceed the noted concentrations):

- 80 micrograms per cubic metre for fine particulate matter
- 82 parts per billion for ozone
- 159 parts per billion for nitrogen dioxide
- 172 parts per billion for sulphur dioxide
- 13 parts per million for carbon monoxide
- 1 part per million for hydrogen sulphide and total reduced sulphur

In Alberta, special community messaging is used when the level of specific pollutants is higher than specified odour or visibility thresholds but the AQHI is rated as "Low" or "Moderate" risk. This messaging is used for the following pollutants (when they exceed the noted concentrations):

- 25 micrograms per cubic metre for fine particulate matter (based on visibility)
- 100 parts per billion for sulphur dioxide (based on odour)
- 10 parts per billion for hydrogen sulphide or total reduced sulphur (based on odour)

An example of this special odour/visibility messaging can be: "While you may detect an odour or change in visibility or clarity, enjoy your outdoor activities unless you experience symptoms."

== Persons at risk ==
The AQHI is aimed towards two populations: 1. The "general" population; and 2. The "at-risk" populations. The latter consists of children, the elderly and people with existing respiratory or cardiovascular conditions, such as those with asthma, and people suffering from diabetes, heart disease or lung disease.

Children are more vulnerable to air pollution: they have less-developed respiratory and defense systems. Because of their size, they inhale more air per kilogram of body weight than adults. Their elevated metabolic rate and young defense systems make them more susceptible to air pollution.

Seniors are also at a higher risk because of the weakening of the heart, lungs and immune system and increased likelihood of health problems such as heart and lung disease.

Exposure to air pollutants can cause a range of symptoms. People with lung or heart disease may experience increased frequency and/or severity of symptoms, and increased medication requirements. It is recommended that those susceptive should take greater precautions.

== Lifestyle ==
Environment Canada recommends looking for outdoor air quality by checking the AQHI before heading off to work or play as well as to use the forecasts to plan activities, whether over the next hour or the next day. Seniors, parents, those with asthma, and people suffering from diabetes, heart or lung disease, can use the AQHI to assess the immediate risk air pollution poses on their health and take steps to lessen that risk. The AQHI is also recommended for healthy, fit and active people to consult to decide when it is best to exercise or work outdoor.

The best way for someone to use the AQHI is to regularly check the current index value, to pay attention to personal symptoms and self-calibrate to the reported current AQHI value. For example, if symptoms are experienced when the index is a 6, then precaution should be taken when the index is at a 6 or higher by following the corresponding health messages. Then, when an individual knows what number triggers health symptoms, to get in the habit of checking the maximum forecast to plan activities ahead of time.

== See also ==
- National Ambient Air Quality Objectives for Canada
