= Weather rock =

Humorous weather forecasting display

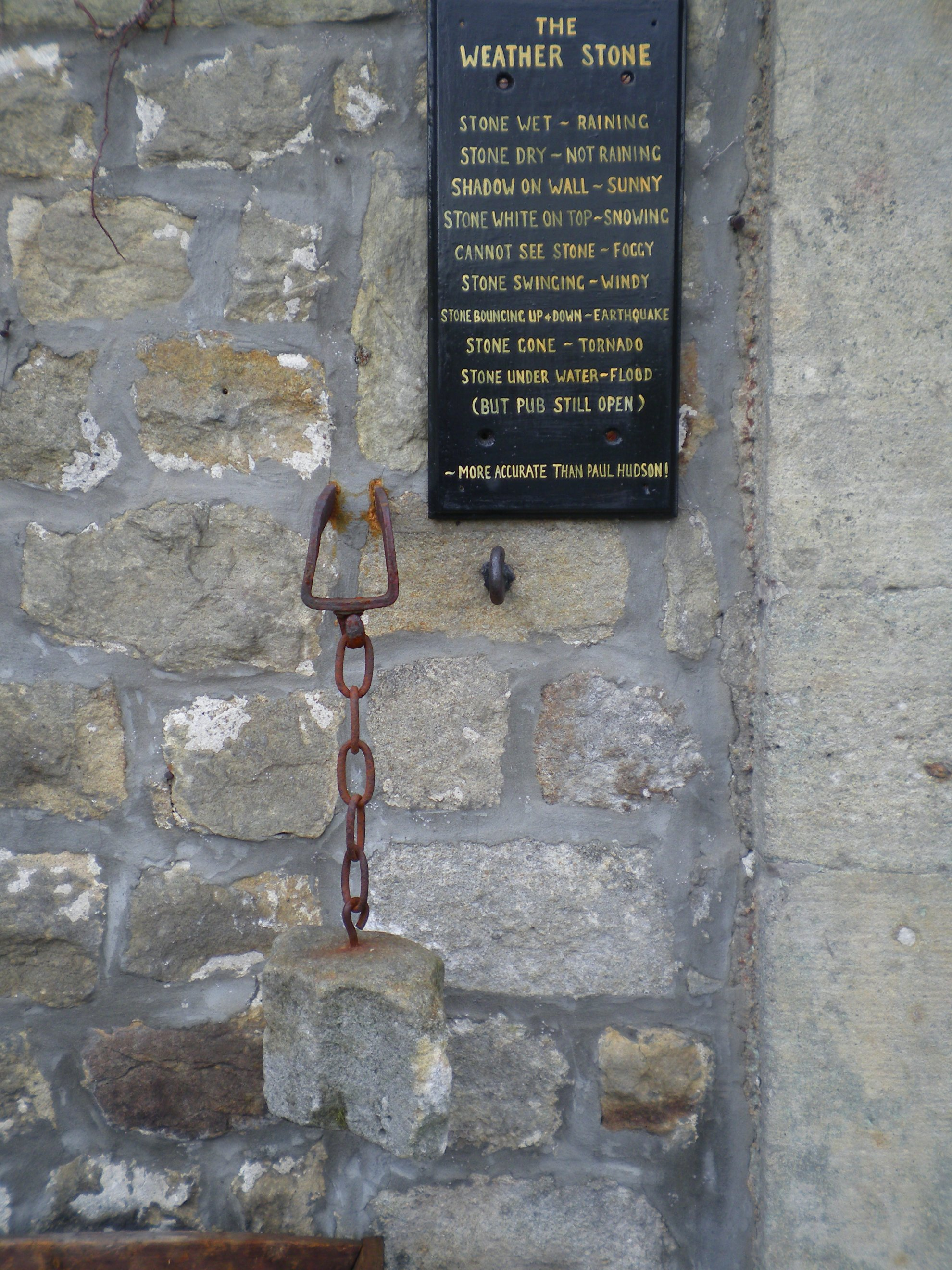
- A weather stone at the Craven Arms pub and cruck barn, Barden, Craven, North Yorkshire, reputedly more accurate than Paul Hudson, a local BBC weather man

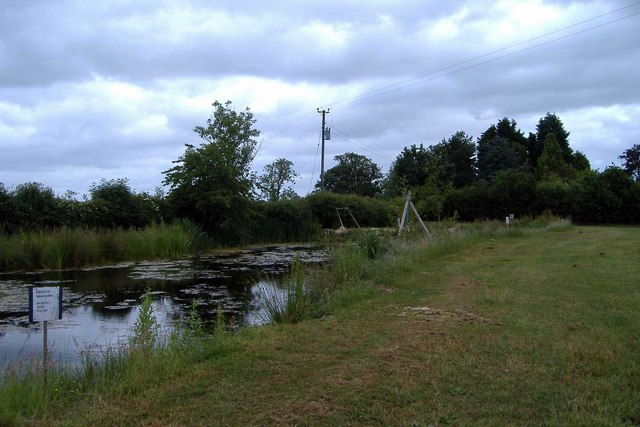
- A Pond at a nature reserve in Kinsey Heath, Audlem, Cheshire, with a tripod from which a weather rock hangs.
- Other names: Weather stone
- Classification: Weather joke
- Uses: Weather forecasting

The weather rock or weather stone is a humorous display that pokes fun at the intricate technology used in modern weather forecasts, as well as the fact that their accuracy is less than perfect. A rock is typically hung from a tripod and accompanied by a sign indicating how to read it. A portable example of such a display, "the famous Maine Weather Stone" of Audubon Camp, Hog Island, was described in late 1981.

== Instructions ==
Some examples of the instructions commonly provided for "reading" a weather rock include:

- If the rock is wet, it's raining.
- If the rock is swinging, the wind is blowing.
- If the rock casts a shadow, the sun is shining.
- If the rock does not cast a shadow and is not wet, the sky is cloudy.
- If the rock is difficult to see, it is foggy.
- If the rock is white, it is snowing.
- If the rock is coated with ice, there is a frost.
- If the ice is thick, it's a heavy frost.
- If the rock is bouncing, there is an earthquake.
- If the rock is under water, there is a flood.
- If the rock is warm, it is sunny.
- If the rock is missing, there is a tornado.
- If the rock is wet and swinging violently, there is a hurricane.
- If the rock can be felt but not seen, it is night time.
- If the rock has white splats on it, watch out for birds.
- If the rock is levitating, you're stoned.
- If there are two rocks, you're drunk.

Weather rocks will sometimes include rules for proper maintenance of the system such as, "Please do not disturb the weather rock, it is a finely tuned instrument!"

== String variation ==
In certain circumstances the string may be incorporated into the saying:

- If the string is on fire then there is a bushfire.
- If the string is cut a Wendigo has passed by.

== Locations ==
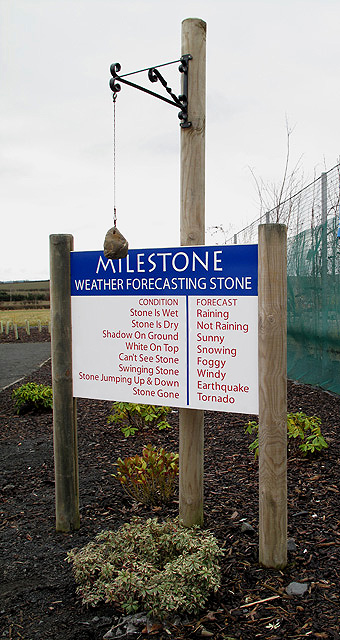
Milestone Weather Forecasting Stone, Newtown St Boswells, Scottish Borders

Weather rocks are located all over the world. Some examples include:

- United States
  - The weather rock at Fort Drum, a US military site in New York.
  - In the Nature Area at Camp Rotary, a Boy Scout summer camp located in Clare, Michigan
  - Camp Wolfeboro, a Boy Scout summer camp in Arnold, California
  - Camp Yawgoog, a Boy Scout summer camp at the Yawgoog Scout Reservation in Rockville, Rhode Island
  - Camp Geronimo, a Boy Scout summer camp in northern Arizona near the Mogollon Rim
  - The Donner's Pass Historic Site, near Lake Tahoe, CA
  - Elliot's Weather Rock in Clearfield, PA.
  - Bloomington Zoo in Central Illinois
  - In Rhododendron, Oregon, near the Zigzag River off Road 10
  - On Spangler Road near Highway 213 in Oregon City, Oregon.
  - Boron, California, in front of Domingo's Mexican and Seafood Restaurant, a famous astronaut hangout near Edwards Air Force Base
  - Seven Ranges Boy Scout Reservation in Kensington, Ohio
  - Firelands Scout Reservation in Wakeman, Ohio
  - Nature Camp in Vesuvius, Virginia
  - Whippi Dip ice cream store, at the Pontaluna road in Spring Lake, MI, near Hoffmaster State Park
  - Marvin's Marvelous Mechanical Museum in Farmington Hills, MI.
  - Lynnhaven Inlet Fishing Pier in Virginia Beach
  - The Kia Kima Scout Reservation in Hardy, Arkansas
  - Casa Sul Lago
  - Boundary Waters Canoe Area, Minnesota
  - Mate Factor Tea Company, Asheville, NC
- Canada
  - At the Pancake Bay Trading Post, near Pancake Bay Provincial Park, Ontario
- Australia
  - Outside the McDonald's restaurant in Lithgow, NSW
  - Tenterfield in NSW
  - Ficks crossing near Kingaroy QLD
  - Pannawonica in WA.
- Netherlands
  - Oostdorp
- United Kingdom
  - Lobster Pot Tea-room on the island of Berneray in the Outer Hebrides, Scotland
  - Amy's Place on the Isle of Skye in the Outer Hebrides, Scotland
  - Humber Lifeboat Station on Spurn Point in the East Riding of Yorkshire
- South Africa
  - The Halyards Hotel in Port Alfred
- Argentina
  - Glaciarium Museum, El Calafate
- Japan
  - The Kiseki Museum of World Stones, Shizuoka Prefecture.
  - Rock-Kun, a streaming channel on both YouTube and Twitch.
- South Korea
  - Jeju Island
- Ireland
  - Brazen Head Pub, Dublin
- France
  - Airport Le Touquet-Paris-Plage
- Turkey
  - Gülyalı, Ordu
  - Uzungöl, Trabzon

== See also ==
- Nowcasting (meteorology)
