= 3D nowcasting =

Experimental technology in meteorology

3D nowcasting refers to an experimental technology of nowcasting in meteorology that uses a rapid phased-array radar to predict precipitation several minutes in advance. The phased-array radar takes a scan of the sky in anywhere from 10 to 30 seconds, viewing 100 vertical levels in a range of 60 km. thus providing inputs every 30 seconds. It divides the sky into several "layers" and uses a new algorithm for forecasting very quickly. The models use the K computer, requiring a large amount of observational data, and a large amount of computational power. The radar produces 100 times more data than the conventional parabolic antenna radar.

== Current research ==
Current research is being led by the RIKEN Advanced Institute for Computational Science (AICS) with the National Institute of Information and Communications Technology (NICT), Tokyo Metropolitan University, and Osaka University. The technology is in experimental form as of July 4, 2017.

== Past research ==
Since 2003, the U.S. National Oceanic and Atmospheric Administration has been experimenting with phased-array weather radar as a replacement for conventional parabolic antenna to provide more time resolution in atmospheric sounding. This could be significant with severe thunderstorms, as their evolution can be better evaluated with more timely data.

== Availability ==
3D nowcasting is being tested in Osaka, Kyoto and Kobe, all in Japan.

== Alternatives ==
Parabolic-antenna radar, which scans every 5 minutes for 15 scan levels.
