= Nowcasting (meteorology) =

Weather forecasting on a very short term

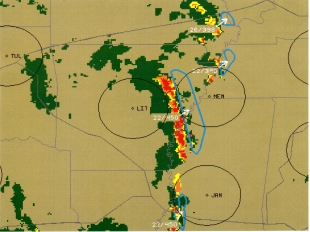
Forecast (blue lines) by « AutoNowcaster » for a thunderstorm line

Nowcasting is weather forecasting on a very short term mesoscale period of up to 2 hours, according to the World Meteorological Organization, and up to six hours, according to other authors in the field. This forecast is an extrapolation in time of known weather parameters, including those obtained by means of remote sensing, using techniques that take into account a possible evolution of the air mass. This type of forecast therefore includes details that cannot be solved by numerical weather prediction (NWP) models running over longer forecast periods.

== Principle ==
Nowcasting in meteorology uses surface weather station data, wind profiler data, and any other weather data available to initialize the current weather situation and forecast by extrapolation for a period of 0 to 6 hours. In this time range it is possible to forecast small features such as individual storms with reasonable accuracy. Weather radar echoes and satellite data, giving cloud coverage, are particularly important in nowcasting because they are very detailed and pick out the size, shape, intensity, speed and direction of movement of individual features of weather on a continuous basis and a vastly better resolution than surface weather stations.

This used to be a simple extrapolation by a forecaster for the following few hours. But with the development of mesoscale numerical weather models, these information can be ingested into an expert system to produce a much better forecast combining numerical weather prediction and local effects not normally possible to be known beforehand. Different research groups, public and private, have developed such programs.

For instance, the French weather service, Météo-France, is using a software, named ASPIC to extrapolate to a fine scale the areas of precipitation. Other examples are AutoNowcaster which has been developed by UCAR to predict short term motion and evolution of thunderstorms, 3D nowcasting an experimental technology by the RIKEN Advanced Institute for Computational Science and private firms like Tomorrow.io (formerly ClimaCell) using its proprietary HyperCast software for nowcasting precipitation type and intensity at 300-500 m geospatial resolution.

== Usage ==
Data extrapolation, including development or dissipation, can be used to find the likely location of a moving weather system. The intensity of rainfall from a particular cloud or group of clouds can be estimated, giving a very good indication as to whether to expect flooding, the swelling of a river etc. Depending on the area of built-up space, drainage and land-use in general, a forecast warning may be issued.

Nowcasting is thus used for public safety, weather sensitive operation like snow removal, for aviation weather forecasts in both the terminal and en-route environment, marine safety, water and power management, off-shore oil drilling, construction industry and leisure industry. The strength of nowcasting lies in the fact that it provides location-specific forecasts of storm initiation, growth, movement and dissipation, which allows for specific preparation for a certain weather event by people in a specific location.

Nowcasting is recognized as having enormous value in desertic areas such as in sub-Saharan Africa, where rapidly changing weather conditions can have a dramatic impact on populations and economic activity, which can be mitigated by early warning.

== Research ==
The short term forecast is as old as weather forecasting itself. During the nineteenth century, the first modern meteorologists were using extrapolation methods for predicting the movement of low pressure systems and anticyclones on surface maps. The researchers subsequently applied the laws of fluid dynamics to the atmosphere and developed the NWP as we know it today. However, the data resolution and parameterization of meteorological primitive equations still leave uncertainty about the small-scale projections, in time and space.

The arrival of remote sensing means, such as radar and satellite, and more rapid development of the computer, greatly help to fill that gap. For instance, digital radar systems made it possible to track thunderstorms, providing users with the ability to acquire detailed information of each storm tracked, since the late 1980s. They are first identified by matching precipitation raw data to a set of preprogrammed characteristics into the system, including signs of organization in the horizontal and continuity in the vertical. Once the thunderstorm cell is identified, speed, distance covered, direction, and Estimated Time of Arrival (ETA) are all tracked and recorded to be utilized later.

In 2017, the arrival of passive sensing means, such as wireless networks, helped progress nowcasting even further. It became possible to receive inputs every minute and achieve greater accuracy in short-term forecasting.

Several countries have developed nowcasting programs as previously mentioned. The World Meteorological Organization (WMO) supports these efforts and held test campaigns of such systems at various occasions. For example, during the Olympic Games in Sydney and Beijing, several countries were invited to use their software to support the Games.

Several scientific conferences addressing the topic. In 2009, WMO has even organized a symposium devoted to Nowcasting.

== See also ==
- Extrapolation
- Computer simulation
- Weather rock, a funny nowcasting
