= National Ambient Air Quality Objectives =

The first Canadian National Ambient Air Quality Objectives were developed in the mid-1970s. These objectives were set for various air pollutants. The NAAQO had three levels indicating severity (maximum desirable, acceptable and tolerable levels) and also evaluated effect levels (maximum desirable, acceptable and tolerable levels).

In 1992, a review of the NAAQOs suggested that many air pollutants had no effect thresholds (e.g. tropospheric ozone or very low effect thresholds). As such, scientifically defensible effect levels could not be identified. In 2000, the revised NAAQOs framework specifies a Reference Level, above which there are demonstrated effects on human health and/or the environment, and an Air Quality Objective (AQO), which is meant to be protective for the general public and environment and which also considers aspects of technical feasibility. This approach is different from how the National Ambient Air Quality Standards are set in the US, where cost is explicitly not considered in the proposal to strengthen the air quality standards to protect human health and the environment. In addition, the US NAAQS are periodically reviewed, frequently strengthened, commonly enforced and allow serious legal penalties if the standards are not met. In contrast, the Canadian NAAQOs are infrequently reviewed, rarely strengthened, not enforced, and the only penalty for not meeting the Canadian NAAQOs is shame.

The original NAAQOs have not been formally revised to the new two-level system. As an interim approach, data are compared with the existing desirable and acceptable NAAQOs for sulphur dioxide, carbon monoxide, nitrogen dioxide and ozone.

The air quality objectives must be consistent with the Canadian Environmental Protection Act (CEPA) 1999. They must also be based on scientific principles, such as risk assessment and risk management. The NAAQOs are set by the federal government based on recommendations from a National Advisory Committee and Working Group on Air Quality Objectives and Guidelines. Provincial governments have the option of adopting these either as objectives or as enforceable standards according to their legislation.

The NAQOs were made with the intention to protect the general population as well as the environment from the harm of bad air quality. The executive summary of the National Ambient Air Quality Objectives states the effect of air pollutants on the environment include less than desired growth conditions for vegetation and the adverse health effects on people include an increased risk of death and lung disease. One recognized pollutant is carbon monoxide, CO, which the NAAQOs have set the desired levels as previously mentioned. For CO, the maximum desirable level over one hour is 13 ppm and 5 ppm over eight hours, the maximum acceptable level is 30 ppm over one hour and 13 ppm over eight hours, and finally the maximum tolerable level is 17.4 ppm over eight hours. For other pollutants, such as sulphur dioxide, SO2, the levels are also described as reported by McKitrick and Aliakbari.

The standards are also described on the Canadian Council of Ministers of the Environment (CCME) website titled "Canada's Air" along with other graphical data that show air pollution trends in the country. Since the objectives must be subject to a scientific assessment there are many studies done on air pollutants in the Canadian region such as one study done in the Vancouver area that measures the sensitivity of ozone to nitrous oxide or volatile organic compounds (VOCs). Furthermore, in an archived report some considerations offered were to focus on a 24 hour range rather than the peak exposure times as some of the data suggests. It also mentions that it is wise to keep in mind that the data described varies by region so the levels could be different in multiple areas depending on their own lifestyles.
