= Air stagnation =

Air mass remaining over an area for an extended period

Air stagnation is a meteorological condition that occurs when there is a lack of atmospheric movement, leading to the accumulation of pollutants and particles that can decline the air quality in a particular region. This condition typically correlates with air pollution and poor air quality due to the possible health risks it can cause to humans and the environment. Due to light winds and lack of precipitation, pollutants cannot be cleared from the air, either gaseous (such as ozone) or particulate (such as soot or dust).

== Causes ==
Typically air stagnation events develop under warm high-pressure systems, where conditions are stagnant and there is little vertical and horizontal air movement. When there is a stable atmospheric environment, pollutants are accumulated in areas near the surface. These pollutants include both gaseous and particulate matter such as ground-level O_{3} and PM_{2.5}. Ground-level ozone and particulate matter originate from different sources and human activities such as power plants and refineries that pollute the environment around the affected area. With limited dispersion and a lack of atmospheric mixing, the amount of pollutants increase and stay stagnant for days. According to the National Climatic Data Center, stagnation events are characterized with having light low level winds, light upper level winds, and a lack of precipitation. These meteorological conditions show how atmospheric circulation and precipitation patterns are correlated with air stagnation events.

== Urban areas and precipitation ==
Air stagnation becomes a significant issue in urban areas with high pollution sources because there is an increase in the amount of particulates that are being produced daily, causing prolonged events. In addition, urban areas can contribute to localized warming known as heat islands, that inhibit the dispersion of these pollutants and worsen air stagnation. Weather fluctuations may cause a lack of precipitation and storm systems that contribute to the pollutants being stagnant and persisting for an extended period of time. With the absence of rain, there is a reduced amount of atmospheric mixing and the build up of particulates continues.

== Air Stagnation Advisory ==
In the United States, the National Weather Service issues an Air Stagnation Advisory when these conditions are likely to occur. When substantial accumulations of smoke, dust, industrial emissions, or air pollution are predicted to occur close to the ground for a prolonged amount of time, the National Weather Service issues this product. These conditions are more likely to occur during the seasons of summer and fall and the number of stagnation days during fall and summer tend to be much higher. In addition, spatial variations during winter and spring tend to be incoherent and there are less air stagnation event advisories.

== Health risks ==
Air stagnation can lead to a decrease in air quality, which could cause health problems such as respiratory issues or diminished lung function for certain individuals. Poor air quality can also cause some symptoms such as difficulty breathing, coughing, and headaches. Typically pollutants irritate the respiratory system and trigger respiratory conditions such as asthma and chronic bronchitis that make it difficult for them to go outside. During air stagnation events, it is recommended for children, elders, and people with pre-existing health conditions, to stay inside as much as possible and stay hydrated.

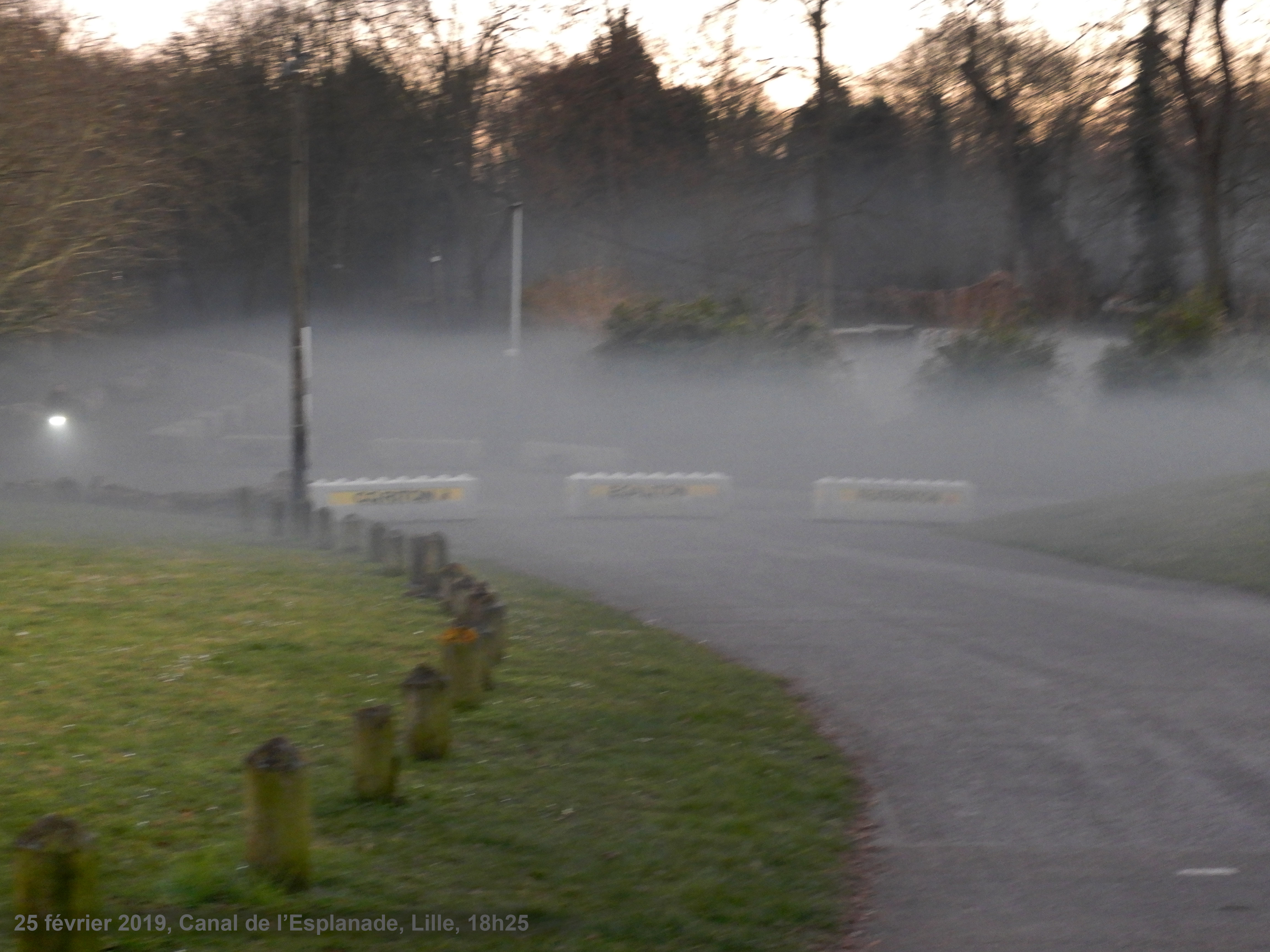
An example or air stagnation in Northern France, where a sheet of black, thick, and odorous smoke formed and stagnated for a few meters.
