= Japan Weather Association =

Meteorological company of Japan

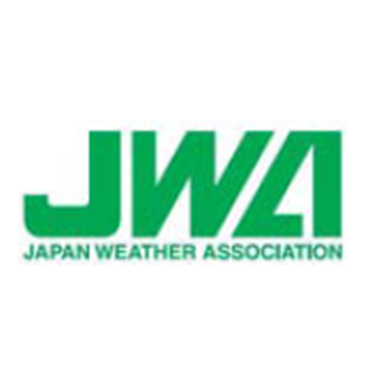
Logo of Japan Weather Association

Japan Weather Association (Japanese: 日本気象協会 JWA) is a Japanese weather forecasting company founded in 1950. The company owns the tenki.jp web portal since 1997, which until 2002 was limited to climate and disaster information.
