= Canadian Council of Ministers of the Environment =

Canadian inter-governmental organization

The Canadian Council of Ministers of the Environment (CCME) is an inter-governmental organization in Canada. CCME was established in 1964 and is composed of members from the federal government, ten provincial governments and three territorial governments.

The purpose of the CCME is to "achieve positive environmental results, focusing on issues that are national in scope and that require collective attention by a number of governments."

== Core activities ==
CCME's core activities focus on interjurisdictional issues (e.g., climate change, air pollution, waste management, contaminants in water and soil). Members may propose development of nationally consistent environmental standards, guidance and objectives to support achieving common environmental quality objectives across the country. CCME's recommendations may be adopted by member jurisdictions but they are not binding as the CCME has no authority to implement or enforce legislation.

=== CCME Canada-Wide Standards ===
The CCME develops Canada-wide Standards (CWS) to protect and reduce risk to the environment and human health where issues are most efficiently addressed with a common approach.

== Organizational structure ==
=== Council of Ministers ===
Membership is at the ministerial level and meetings typically occur at least annually to discuss national environmental priorities and determine work to be implemented through the CCME organization.

=== Environmental Planning and Protection Committee ===
Purpose is to establish and provide direction to intergovernmental working groups tasked with addressing CCME priority issues, and to reach consensus on proposed policies, standards and guidelines. Members are senior staff from each jurisdiction (assistant deputy minister level).

=== Working Groups ===
Purpose is to work cooperatively in response to direction from senior committees to achieve specific goals. Membership depends on the purpose and function of the group.

==== Water Quality Working Group ====
Purpose is to develop national water quality guidelines; identifies indicators to measure ecosystem health. The Secretariat for this group is the National Guidelines and Standards Office (Environment Canada).

Results

- Canadian Water Quality Guidelines (1987) - includes recommended guidelines for raw water for drinking water supply, recreational water quality and aesthetics, aquatic life (freshwater and marine), agricultural uses (irrigation and livestock watering), and industrial water supplies. Now includes 19 appendices and 41 guidelines
- Canadian Environmental Quality Guidelines (1999). Includes factsheets for guidelines (water, sediment, soil and tissue quality) and CCME protocols to develop Canadian Environmental Quality Guidelines.

==== Contaminated Sites Working Group ====
Purpose is to develop national soil quality guidelines to protect environmental and human health. The Secretariat for this group is the National Guidelines and Standards Office (Environment Canada) Core activities are technical coordination and delivery of new and revised soil quality guidelines; development of Canada-wide Standards for soil contaminants.

Results

- Guidance documents to manage contaminated sites in Canada.
- Guidance documents to develop and use of Canadian soil quality guidelines
- Input to the 1999 CCME publication entitled "Canadian Environmental Quality Guidelines".
- Advancement of the Canada-wide Standards for Petroleum Hydrocarbons in soil.
