= NowCast (air quality index) =

American environmental index

PM_{2.5} AQI of US monitors, calculated utilizing NowCast, courtesy US EPA

PM2.5 AQI map, calculated utilizing NowCast, courtesy US EPA

The particulate matter (PM) NowCast is a weighted average of hourly air monitoring data used by the United States Environmental Protection Agency (USEPA) for real-time reporting of the Air Quality Index (AQI) for PM (PM_{10} - particles less than 10 micrometers, or PM_{2.5} - particles less than 2.5 micrometers).

The PM NowCast is computed from the most recent 12 hours of PM monitoring data, but the NowCast weights the most recent hours of data more heavily than an ordinary 12-hour average when pollutant levels are changing. The PM NowCast is used in lieu of a 24-hour average PM concentration in the calculation of the AQI until an entire calendar day of hourly concentrations has been monitored.

The Ozone NowCast is an algorithm developed by the USEPA to predict the 8-hour ozone average centered on the current hour from the current 1-hr average ozone data. At each ozone monitoring site, partial least squares regression is used to develop a predictive relationship between the 1-hr and 8-hr averages using the previous 2 weeks of ozone data. USEPA uses the Ozone Nowcast for real time public reporting of the ozone AQI.

== Calculation of the PM NowCast ==
Let $c_1,c_2,...c_{12}$ represent the hourly PM concentrations for the most recent 12-hour period, with $c_1$ the most recent hourly value, and let $c_{min}$ and $c_{max}$ represent the minimum and maximum hourly concentration for the 12-hour period.

Define:

$$w^* = 1-\frac{c_{max} - c_{min}}{c_{max}} = \frac{c_{min}}{c_{max}}$$

and let

$$w =
\begin{cases}
w^*& \mbox{if } w^* > \frac{1}{2} \\
\frac{1}{2} & \mbox{if } w^*\le \frac{1}{2} \\
\end{cases}$$

With these definitions the PM NowCast is given by:

$$NowCast = \frac{ \sum_{i=1}^{12} w^{i-1} c_{i}}{\sum_{i=1}^{12}w^{i-1}}.$$

For the special case where there is no variability in the hourly values, $c_{min}=c_{max}, w=1$, and the NowCast reduces to the twelve-hour average:

$$NowCast = \frac{ \sum_{i=1}^{12} c_i}{12}.$$

For the special case where w=1/2:

$$NowCast = \frac{ c_1+({\frac{1}{2}})c_2+...+{(\frac
{1}{2}})^{11}{c_{12}} }
{1+\frac{1}{2}+({\frac{1}{2}})^{2}+...+{(\frac{1}{2}})^{11}}$$

But 1/(1-x)=1 + x + x^{2}+ ... , x < 1, so to a good approximation, when w = 1/2:

$$NowCast = \frac{1}{2}c_1+({\frac{1}{2}})^2 c_2+...+{(\frac
{1}{2}})^{12}{c_{12}}$$

Because the most recent hours of data are weighted so heavily in the NowCast when PM levels are changing, EPA does not report the NowCast when data is missing for c_{1} or c_{2}.

Consider a day when the hourly average PM_{2.5} concentration is zero for all hours of the day, except for a single hour from noon to 1 pm, where a monitor records a concentration pulse of 144.0 micrograms per cubic meter (μg/m^{3}). According to the equation above, the Nowcast is 144/2 μg/m^{3}=72.0 μg/m^{3} the hour after the pulse, two hours later it is 144/4 μg/m^{3}=36.0 μg/m^{3}, three hours later it is 144/8 μg/m^{3}= 18.0 μg/m^{3}, and four hours later it is 144/16 μg/m^{3}= 9.0 μg/m^{3}.To calculate the corresponding AQI values, each NowCast concentration is substituted into the AQI equation in place of the 24-hour average PM_{2.5} concentration:

$$I  = \frac {C-C_{low}}{ C_{high} -C_{low} }(I_{high} -I_{low}) +I_{low}$$

where:

$I$ = the AQI,
$C$ = the 24-hour average PM_{2.5} pollutant concentration,
$C_{low}$= the concentration breakpoint that is ≤ $C$,
$C_{high}$= the concentration breakpoint that is ≥ $C$,
$I_{low}$= the index breakpoint corresponding to $C_{low}$,
$I_{high}$= the index breakpoint corresponding to $C_{high}$.

and:

$C_{low}$	$C_{high}$	$I_{low}$	$I_{high}$	Category
0	9.0	0	50	Good
9.1	35.4	51	100	Moderate
35.5	55.4	101	150	Unhealthy for Sensitive Groups
55.5	125.4	151	200	Unhealthy
125.5	225.4	201	300	Very Unhealthy
225.5	325.4	301	500	Hazardous

Thus, the four NowCast concentrations correspond to air quality indices of

163, (AQI Color Code Red, Air Quality: Unhealthy), 102, (AQI Color Code Orange, Air Quality: Unhealthy for Sensitive Groups), 68 (AQI Color Code Yellow, Air Quality: Moderate ), and 50, (AQI Color Code Green, Air Quality: Good) respectively. After the day is over and all of the hourly data is available, the AQI for the day is calculated from the 24-hr average; 144/24 μg/m^{3}= 6.0 μg/m^{3}, an AQI of 33 (Color Code Green, Air Quality: Good). EPA has developed a calculator to compute the PM NowCast, AQI, and AQI category and color from the most recent 12 hours of monitoring data.
