= Air pollution in the United States =

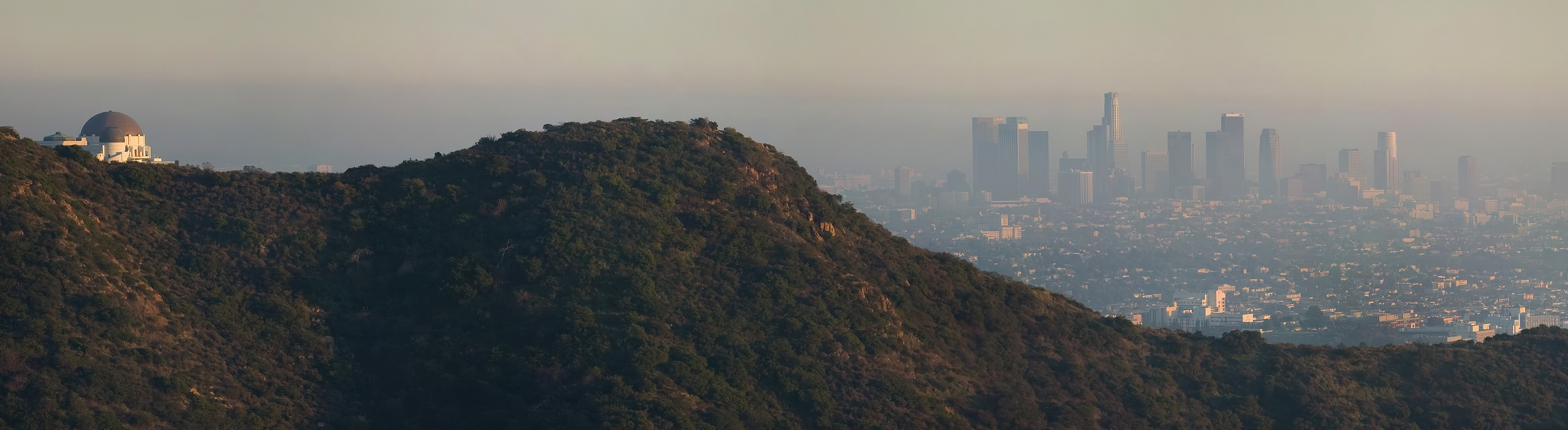
Looking down from the Hollywood Hills, with Griffith Observatory on the hill in the foreground, air pollution is visible in downtown Los Angeles on a late afternoon.

Air pollution is the introduction of chemicals, particulate matter, or biological materials into the atmosphere that cause harm or discomfort to humans or other living organisms, or damage ecosystems. Health problems attributed to air pollution include premature death, cancer, organ failure, infections, behavioral changes, and other diseases. These health effects are not equally distributed across the U.S. population; there are demographic disparities by race, ethnicity, socioeconomic status, and education. Air pollution can derive from natural sources, such as wildfires and volcanoes, or from anthropogenic sources. Anthropogenic air pollution has affected the United States since the beginning of the Industrial Revolution.

According to a 2024 report: "39% of people living in America—131.2 million people—still live in places with failing grades for unhealthy levels of ozone or particle pollution." Analyzing data from 2020 to 2022, the American Lung Association found the number of people living in counties with a failing grade for ozone declined, this year by 2.4 million people.

A 2016 study reported that levels of nitrogen oxides, which contribute to smog and acid rain, had plummeted over the previous decade, due to better regulations, economic shifts, and technological innovations. The National Aeronautics and Space Administration (NASA) reported a 32% decrease of nitrogen dioxide in New York City and a 42% decrease in Atlanta between the periods of 2005–2007 and 2009–2011.

During June 2023, due to early season wildfires in Canada, cities like New York and Washington D.C. suffered from dangerous levels of air pollution. It was the worst regional air quality in decades for the Northeast.

== Regulation ==
Death rate from ozone pollution

US counties that are designated "nonattainment" for National Ambient Air Quality Standards, as of September 30, 2017.

In the 1950s, 1970s, and 1990s, the United States Congress enacted a series of Clean Air Acts that significantly strengthened regulation of air pollution. Individual U.S. states, some European nations, and eventually the European Union followed these initiatives. The Clean Air Act sets numerical limits on the concentrations of certain air pollutants and provides reporting and enforcement mechanisms. The U.S. Environmental Protection Agency (EPA) is the federal agency responsible for creating and enforcing regulations that implement these laws.

The effects of these laws have been very positive. Between 1970 and 2006, U.S. citizens enjoyed the following reductions in annual pollution emissions:

- carbon monoxide emissions fell from 197 million tons to 89 million tons;
- nitrogen oxide emissions fell from 27 million tons to 19 million tons;
- sulfur dioxide emissions fell from 31 million tons to 15 million tons;
- particulate emissions fell by 80%; and
- lead emissions fell by more than 98%.

A 2020 paper reported that about half of air pollution and half of the resulting deaths are caused by emissions from outside a given state's boundaries, typically from prevailing winds moving west to east. Regulation of air pollution is a shared responsibility between federal, state, and local governments.

Since 1999, the EPA has used the air quality index (AQI) to communicate air pollution risk to the public, on a scale from 0 to 500, with six levels from Good to Hazardous. (The previous version was the Pollutant Standards Index (PSI), which did not incorporate PM2.5 and ozone standards.)

=== Ozone ===
The US EPA has estimated that limiting ground-level ozone concentration to 65 parts per billion (ppb), would avert 1,700 to 5,100 premature deaths nationwide in 2020 compared with the 75 ppb standard. The agency projected the more protective standard would also prevent an additional 26,000 cases of aggravated asthma, and more than a million cases of missed work or school. Following this assessment, the EPA acted to protect public health by lowering the National Ambient Air Quality Standards (NAAQS) for ground-level ozone to 70 ppb.

=== National Ambient Air Quality Standards ===
The standards for determining whether an area is in "attainment" (compliance) or "non-attainment" (non-compliance) for six major pollutants are the National Ambient Air Quality Standards (NAAQS). These are required by law to be reviewed every five years, as new scientific information becomes available on the health and property impacts of pollution. These reviews typically cause political controversy as tighter requirements can have economic consequences for automobile manufacturers and companies that emit pollutants. State and local governments are responsible for enacting and enforcing regulations that achieve the federal standards, by limiting emissions from local sources.

=== Mobile source standards ===
Standards for emissions from motor vehicles are set exclusively by the federal government and the state of California under a long-standing EPA waiver. This task is delegated to the California Air Resources Board (CARB). Other states are allowed to adopt the California standard or the federal government's but not set their own standards. States also can and do adopt policies that affect automobile emissions, such as vehicle inspection regimes, electric vehicle subsidies, and provision of public transportation. Corporate average fuel economy standards are also set by the federal government. Though they have a significant impact on air pollution, they were originally created in response to the 1973–74 Arab Oil Embargo, and are administered by the National Highway Traffic Safety Administration, not the EPA.

=== Acid rain program ===
The United States has a "cap-and-trade" program for two of the major pollutants, sulfur dioxide and nitrogen oxides. The Acid Rain Program, as it is known, applies to power plants that use fossil fuels, and was required by the Clean Air Act of 1990.

=== Hazardous air pollutants ===
A much longer list of chemicals for which the EPA requires the maximum achievable reduction are covered by the National Emissions Standards for Hazardous Air Pollutants.

In 2009, the CARB established rules for allowable emissions of formaldehyde from wood products made of pieces, chips, particles, or fibers of wood bonded together with a resin. EPA issued regulations to limit formaldehyde emissions in 2016.

=== Greenhouse gases ===
Regulation of greenhouse gases under the Clean Air Act has been the subject of lawsuits. While the EPA has been given clear authority to regulate greenhouse gases, the question of the strictness of these regulations has resulted in the EPA not enacting substantial curbs.

==== Paris Agreement ====
The Obama administration signed a greenhouse gas reduction agreement with China and then joined the Paris Agreement in 2015, but President Trump withdrew from the agreement on June 1, 2017. President Biden rejoined the United Nations Paris Agreement on January 20, 2021, with the United Nations and its Secretary-General António Guterres accepting and fully re-ratifying the U.S. rejoining the agreement on February 19, 2021.

==== Clean Power Plan ====
On August 3, 2015, the Obama administration unveiled its Clean Power Plan, an EPA policy designed to limit carbon dioxide emissions at power plants. It was expected to reduce air pollutants by up to 25%, which would improve health outcomes (such as a decrease in premature deaths and childhood asthma) for those who live near factories and chemical facilities. The plan was expected to negatively impact jobs in the steel, cement, and refining production industries but positively impact jobs in the solar and wind power sectors. On March 28, 2017, President Donald Trump ordered the EPA to review the policy. In June 2019, the Trump administration reversed the Clean Power Plan, allowing coal-fired power plants to remain open longer. This action largely left greenhouse gas regulations to state and local governments, some of which have joined interstate greenhouse gas reduction programs. In 2024, the Biden Administration issued a suite of rules called the Greenhouse Gas Standards and Guidelines for Fossil Fuel-Fired Power Plants, sometimes called the "Clean Power Plan 2.0", to replace the Clean Power Plan.

== Health effects ==
Though the rate of exposure to ground-level ozone ("smog") and small-particulate matter ("soot") has been declining, in 2026, nearly half of people in the US under age 18 live in an area receiving a failing grade for at least one measure of air pollution.

Due to air pollution causing more than one effect it is hard to attribute a condition only to air pollution or to say how much a given source is responsible. However, it is believed that around 100,000 to 200,000 human deaths are attributable to air pollution and at least a quarter are due to transportation. This compares with the approximate 33,000 from gun deaths or recent average of 35,000 from motor vehicle collisions, which are both also attributable to human technology application. There are also significant non-human deaths and effects.

=== Asthma ===
As air pollution increases, symptoms of asthma worsen. Asthma's etiology is poorly understood and currently has no cure. There are many environmental factors that attribute to asthma. The main sources of environmental pollution are the burning of fossil fuels in the combustion engines, dust generated by traffic on road surfaces, and biomass used for cooking and heating. In urban areas, there are high concentrations of particulate matter, nitrogen dioxide, ozone, and other volatile organic compounds and can make breathing more difficult. The health effects of particulate matters with different diameters are related to the length of those particles staying in the atmosphere and the locations of infection in the respiratory tract Young children who are exposed to air pollution are extremely vulnerable. One reason they are more vulnerable is because the average breathing pattern for an adult is 16 to 20 breaths per minute, while a 1-year-old child has a faster breathing pattern which is 20 to 40 breaths per minute. Therefore, children will be inhaling more pollutants than adults.

In June 2023, Following exposure to dangerous air quality pollution in New York and Washington, DC, there have been reports of health effects - including scratchy throats, runny noses, and wheezing.

==== Prenatal exposure and links to asthma ====
Prenatal exposures to air pollution have influenced respiratory health starts in utero. Mothers who were exposed to PM2.5 weekly during gestation, were likely to have a child diagnosed with asthma by the age 6 years. Many of the mothers exposed to PM2.5 were ethnic minorities (54% Hispanic, 30% black), had 12 or fewer years of education (66%), and did not smoke in pregnancy (80%). Inner-city children from the age of 5–11 years old were diagnosed with Asthma, due to prenatal exposure to phthalates, butylbenzyl phthalate (BBzP), di-n-butyl phthalate (DnBP), di(2-ethylhexyl) phthalate (DEHP), and diethyl phthalate (DEP). These phthalates were detected in urine samples from 300 pregnant women.

Roughly seven million children suffer from asthma, meaning 1 out of every 10 children, and the rates have been steadily increasing. Among African American children, one out of six children suffers from asthma, which has risen by 50% since 2001. This issue of respiratory problems accounts for 88% of premature deaths in low-income to middle-class counties in America. Population-based studies have shown that communities with a high proportion of African Americans and Hispanics experience high rates of asthma.

==== Exposures to airborne particulate matter components in New York ====
In a study conducted by Yale University, 'Environmental Inequality in Exposures to Airborne Particulate Matter Components in the United States', Hispanics were exposed to 10 out of the 14 pollutants (e.g., 152% higher than whites for chlorine, 94% higher for aluminum), African Americans were exposed to 13 out of the 14 pollutants (e.g., 43% higher for zinc, 25% for vanadium), and Asians had higher exposures than whites (e.g., 103% for chlorine, 69% for vanadium, 64% for nickel). Some of the pollutants studied have been connected to asthma. In Bronx, New York, 66% of individuals who live in proximity of hazardous industrial facilities and waste sites are likely to be hospitalized for asthma. It has been reported that people who live within 1.86 miles of toxic waste facilities in the United States are people of color and twice as likely as white residents to live within a fence line zone of an industrial facility, contribute to air pollution, safety issues, and health concerns.

=== Heart disease ===
In the United States, cardiovascular disease kills a person every 40 seconds. While the effects of air pollution on the respiratory diseases are well understood, air pollution also affects the cardiovascular system at the same level as or higher level than the respiratory system, and the adverse cardiovascular health outcomes in both children and adults are high when exposed to air pollution. Carbon monoxide, oxides of nitrogen, sulfur dioxide, ozone, lead, and particulate matter are also associated with increased hospitalization and mortality due to cardiovascular disease. Chromosomal damage is high among African American children and their mothers from Oakland, California who are exposed to traffic and regional ozone levels. Coronary heart disease has been one of the leading cause of death in ethnic groups. One study found that PM2.5 exposure increases the risk of cardiovascular diseases by 13%. Also, those who live in the area of lower socioeconomic status have higher risk of cardiovascular diseases caused by PM2.5 exposure.

Indoor air pollution, caused by kerosene space heaters, cooking, wall paints, second hand smoke and more, are also known to have an association with the cardiovascular diseases. This increased risk of cardiovascular diseases by indoor air pollution disproportionately affects the people in the United States. The prevalence of being exposed to secondhand smoke is higher in African American population and lower income population, especially in those who live below the poverty level. On the other hand, the risk of fatal cardiovascular diseases is higher in African American men and women than white men and women. For example, 25% of African American men have 6.67% or greater increased risk of fatal cardiovascular disease while only 10% of the white men have the same level of increased risk. Furthermore, one county-level study found that median income and education level were the most significant factors associated with the cardiovascular diseases mortality disparities in the United States.

=== Infection and cancer ===
Exposure to air pollution increases the risk of developing respiratory infections and cancers. Inhaled air pollutants damage the respiratory system and can lead to infections or cancer. Respiratory infections and cancer are related to each other. Having a respiratory infection raise the risk of cancer and vice versa. Also, studies show that the risk of the respiratory infections and cancers caused by air pollution are not distributed equally in terms of race, class, and geographic placement.

==== Infections ====
Even though the mechanistic association between air pollution and infections is still unclear and require further research, some studies shows that the some air pollutants, including secondhand smoking, ozone (O_{3}), particulate matter (PM), and nitrogen dioxide (NO_{2}), may cause the infections. According to the Consumer Product Safety Commission (CPSC), children have higher risk of lower respiratory tract infections, such as pneumonia and bronchitis, if their parents smoke. CPSC mentions that 150,000 to 300,000 children (under 18 month) are affected by the lower respiratory tract infections which leads to 7,500 to 15,000 hospitalizations each year based on the EPA estimation. Exposure to higher level NO_{2} or long term exposure to low level NO_{2} also leads to higher risk for infections.

Biological air pollution also can lead to the infections. Small, invading organisms in human body, such as bacteria, viruses, fungi, or parasites, can cause infections in the pulmonary system. There are variety of infections because many different organisms can cause the infections.

The prevalence of the bacterial infections is not equally distributed in terms race of and socioeconomic status. In the United States, bacterial pneumonia, caused by Streptococcus pneumoniae bacteria (pneumococcus) which enters human body usually via inhalation, is significantly associated with morbidity and mortality among adults. The risk of being diagnosed with bacterial pneumonia is more than double in African American people compared to white people (RR= 2.40). Also the prevalence of bacterial pneumonia in most impoverished African American census area, 20% or more people in the area live below the federal poverty level, is 4.44 times higher than the least impoverished white census area, less than 5% of the population in the area live below the federal poverty level, and 2.12 time higher than most impoverished white census area.

==== Cancer ====
Many studies found that both indoor and outdoor air pollution can increase the risk of respiratory cancer. Indoor pollution such as tobacco smoking is responsible to lung cancer. Outdoor air pollution also increases the risk of lung cancer. A study found that the combination of formaldehyde and benzene is responsible for 60% of cancer related health problems in the United States. Air pollutants can also cause other types of cancer. Another study found that the hazardous air pollutant (HAP) can cause cervical cancer and the upper aero-digestive tract cancer.

The cancer caused by air pollution is not equally distributed in the United States. Cancer incidence and death rates are higher in African Americans than other races. A study conducted in Greater Houston, Texas shows that Hispanics and African-Americans have higher risks of HAP cancer. People who live near the public transit exhibit have higher HAP cancer risk as well. Furthermore, another study shows that highly segregated metropolitan areas have higher estimated cancer risk caused by the air pollution. This trend was found for all racial groups, but was the strongest for Hispanics.

A study conducted in 2000 used geographic census data and outdoor nitrogen dioxide (NO_{2}) concentration data to examine the disparities of NO_{2} air pollution across the United States. The study found that there is disproportional disparities in terms of both race and socioeconomic groups. The people of color were exposed to 4.6 ppb more than average NO_{2} concentrations than white people. Those who live in below poverty level are exposed to 1.2 ppb more. Lower-income Caucasians are exposed to 3.4 ppb higher NO_{2} concentrations than the higher-income Caucasians. The study also reports disproportional disparities of NO_{2} concentration exposure by education level; those who without high school education are more likely to be exposed to higher concentrations. Association between NO_{2} exposure and cancer development has been found in many studies.

The disproportional effects of air pollution on people's cancer risk is seen not only in race difference. Within a single race community, there is unequal distribution of cancer risks. Among the Hispanic population in Miami, Florida, the traffic-related cancer risks are unequally distributed in terms of socioeconomic levels and country of origin. The Hispanic community with lower incomes are more likely to have higher traffic-related cancer risks. Also, it was found that Hispanics originally from Cuba and Colombia have higher risk of cancer caused by the traffic related toxins.

=== Central nervous system ===
Air pollution is traditionally associated with pulmonary problems, but it also affects the entire body. Nano-sized pollutants can enter the body by penetrating pulmonary tissue after it is inhaled and enter the blood stream via capillaries. Once inside the circulatory system, the heart will spread the pollutants throughout the body. One of the places these pollutants accumulate and affect is the brain and nervous system. The brain is constantly changing and growing throughout a person's lifetime by reorganizing its synaptic connections in regards to its changing environment. Therefore, presence and buildup of toxic pollutants in the brain can lead to health problems, diseases, and behavior changes and people living in communities with poor air quality, usually low income, and colored communities, have higher chances of becoming ill.

==== Brain development ====
It is found that children living in areas of high air pollution, particularly high traffic pollution, tend to do worse on standardized testing. Black carbon is very small (PM2.5), very light absorbent pollutant that mostly comes from incomplete combustion of fuels. According to a study in 1986–2001 in Boston, children who were exposed to more black carbon did worse on the standardized tests they were given (Wide Range Assessment of Memory and Learning and the Kaufman Brief Intelligence Test) in all subjects. In the study, there was also association found between increased black carbon levels, worse testing results and children who primarily spoke Spanish at home and have parents with lower education. A similar study conducted was conducted on inner New York City children. This time, the study looked at polycyclic aromatic hydrocarbons (PAH) (PM2.5) which is found in coal, tar, and incomplete combustion emissions. All of the children in the study were African American or Dominican and it was found that they have lower mental development index (MDI) scores and greater chances of having cognitive developmental delay than their Caucasian counterparts living in less polluted parts of the city.

==== Other health problems ====
Air pollution components such as heavy metals and reactive oxygen species can cause central nervous system health problems ranging from neuroinflammation to short-term memory disturbances to Parkinson's. Particulate matter (PM), especially ultrafine particles (UFPM), that make its way up to and stay around the brain also become pro-inflammatory stimulus. This stimulus also leads to neuroinflammation. Human and animal studies show that neuroinflammation leads to neurodegenerative diseases. A study showed that residents aged 54.7 ± 4.8 years from highly polluted cities have significantly higher gene expression for an inflammatory gene in their brain than residents in the same age group from less polluted cities. Though the mechanisms on how PM causes neuroinflammation, many studies hint that there's correlation between air pollutant caused neuroinflammation and development of Parkinson's Disease and Alzheimer Disease.

==== Ozone-related problems ====
Ozone is produced by natural and artificial sources (vehicles, refineries, plants, etc.). It is a very strong oxidizing agent and when inhaled, it attacks tissues by modifying parts of cells and it can create potentially toxic by products. It was found that there is no correlation between ozone effects estimates for mortality and PM readings of an area. In other words, damage done by ozone and by PM cannot be considered the same. Extended periods of inhaling ozone causes neuron damage and death, motor deficits, and memory deficits in humans and animals. Certain groups, such as African Americans, have higher chance of having ozone-caused health issues because of their higher ozone exposure. A study conducted in Los Angeles, CA showed that there is a 12-15% increase in chance for a child to be born with or develop autism if the parents lived in areas with high ozone concentration during the child's gestation period. From the hospital records, it was found that majority of those parents were also Hispanic and were low income families. There were less autistic children born in majority white, highly educated, and high income communities. The same study also found that higher levels of nitrogen dioxide (NO_{2}) and nitric oxide (NO), both can undergo chemical reactions to form ozone, also can increase the chance of Autism in a child.

== Disparities in the effects of air pollution ==
The health consequences of air pollution are often distributed unequally amongst a given area's population, and can impact certain groups of people with greater severity than others. Three factors strongly correlated with increased risk are: race and ethnicity, socioeconomic status and education. The underlying cause of this inequality may involve a multitude of systematic injustices which dictate exposure to harm or access to healthy environmental conditions. Racial discrepancies are particularly distinct in suburban areas of the Southern United States and metropolitan areas of the Midwestern and Western United States. This concept is known as environmental justice.

=== Race and ethnicity ===
In particular, people of color can be more vulnerable to the detrimental effects of air pollution. People of color have significantly less wealth than their white counterparts. Therefore, many communities of color reside in impoverished neighborhoods and face unequal access to environmental health services and resources.

==== Environmental racism ====
Certain environmental injustices can be viewed as discriminatory towards communities of racial minorities. The study of environmental racism highlights any disproportionate exposure to toxins or inaccessibility to ecological benefits such as clean water, clean air, and natural resources. Also, environmental racism is concerned with situations in which the government and large corporations target minority communities in order to commence environmentally damaging projects. They find that in these communities, there is often much less resistance and pressure to terminate these projects. When these projects are undertaken, nearby households and small businesses in these minority communities are negatively affected, sparking health problems among children and an overall decrease in the standard of living.

According to the 2014 Census, the median household income for both African-Americans and Hispanics was about $43,300. On the other hand, white household income was around $71,300. Also, over 91% of African-Americans and 86% of Hispanics live in urban areas, whereas only about 70% of whites live in urban areas. Furthermore, in April 2017, three environmental groups—Environmental Justice and Health Alliance for Chemical Policy Reform, Coming Clean, and Center for Effective Government—completed a study regarding the disproportionate spread of environmental burdens. They define "fenceline zones" as areas within the vicinity of U.S. chemical facilities that are at the highest risk of death or injury after a potential chemical accident. They found that the 134 million people living in "fenceline zones" are 75% more likely to be African-American, 60% more likely to be Latino, and 50% more likely to be classified as having low socioeconomic status. The study was meant to not underline the idea that the United States government fails to justly protect its communities and but also to push the government to update chemical safety regulations nationwide. These factors greatly contribute to the fact minority exposure to harmful air pollutants ranges from 40% to 60% higher than whites—even as air quality is slowly improving as a whole.

=== Socioeconomic status ===
Socioeconomic Status (SES) is an individual's or group's sociological and economic status in society. Low socioeconomic status can correlate to a greater risk of exposure to unsafe and unhealthy conditions. People of lower socioeconomic statuses have an unequal access to resources and safety measures while people of higher socioeconomic statuses have a greater access to health and safety resources/measures.

==== Impact of low socioeconomic status and air pollution on health ====
People of lower socioeconomic status may more frequently have poor health, thus the effects of air pollution can incur additional health risks and shorter lifespans on this population.

In the United States, racial and ethnic minorities, defined as people of color who represent a small portion of the overall population, are socioeconomically disadvantaged, and have a history of past discrimination. There are four recognized minority groups in the United States: Asians and Pacific Islanders, African Americans, Hispanics, and Native Americans. Those of low socioeconomic status and people of color are more vulnerable to the short term and long term effects of air pollution. Short-term health effects of air pollution include but is not limited to bronchitis or pneumonia, frequent headaches, dizziness, and nausea. Some long-term health effects are lung cancer and respiratory diseases, heart disease, and organ damage, and irreversible nerve damage.

People of lower socioeconomic status are found to be more vulnerable to air pollutant, PM 2.5, due to their location. PM 2.5 is an air pollutant, arising from the blend of power plants, refineries, and diesel engines, among other sources, and this particle penetrates the lungs. Communities of low socioeconomic statuses are frequently concentrated in areas near highways, busy roads, and refineries. Therefore, limiting one's exposure to air pollution in an impoverished environment is nearly impossible. Communities of low socioeconomic status face an unequal access to environmental health services and resources.

==== Factors of environmental disparities due to low socioeconomic status ====
Environmental disparities are generally divided into three categories:

1. Sociopolitical explanations in which hazardous facilities located in communities where they lack political capital to influence discussions
2. Market-based explanations in which people who live in polluted areas have lower property value
3. Racial discrimination in the placement of hazardous facilities.

==== Education status ====
In many ways, the socioeconomic status determines the education level that a person can achieve. According to literature, there is a lower rate for students from low socioeconomic status communities to get access to higher level of education compared to the students from more affluent communities. Further studies have indicated that there is a significant correlation between income and educational attainment. Therefore, even though education may not have a direct correlation with the exposure to the environmental injustice, it can still be an indirect indicator of the disparity in the distribution of environmental burden.

== Trump administration ==
In December 2019, the New York Times published a list of 95 environmental rules that the Trump administration was in the process of rolling back or had already rolled back; of these, 25 had to do with air pollution and emissions.

=== Restrictions on the Environmental Protection Agency ===
As of March 2017, the Trump Administration is expected to withdraw the federal waiver that gives the EPA and the state of California the power to efficiently monitor and regulate greenhouse-gas pollution from car tailpipes. Environmental agents and environmental rights activists foreshadow that this action will certainly spell trouble for California's important climate policy; as well as further worsen the disproportionate spread of negative environmental health problems to neighborhoods of color throughout counties in California statewide.

=== The Paris Agreement ===
The Paris Agreement was an agreement created on December 12, 2015, within the United Nations Framework Convention on Climate Change to regulate global climate change as a whole. The Paris Agreement creates policies and regulations for the sustainable development of all regions of the globe with aims of developing technologies that will significantly lower greenhouse gas emissions worldwide as well as increase the ability of all nations to adapt to the multiplying effects of climate change. As of April 2017, 195 countries have signed the agreement and 143 countries have ratified it, already adopting certain policies called upon by the treaty.

The Trump Administration was pushing for the United States to exit the Paris Agreement. European Union energy officials expressed their concerns that the United States exiting the agreement would have substantial negative impacts on the state of the global environment.

On January 20, 2021, the Biden administration reaffirmed the U.S. participation in the Paris Agreement.

=== Energy independence executive order ===
The "Energy Independence" order was issued by the Trump Administration in order to promote energy resources and economic growth by cutting regulations on energy production such as coal, natural gas, nuclear material, flowing water, and other domestic sources, including renewable sources.

=== Revival of the coal industry ===
Trump promised to revive the coal industry and bring back coal-related jobs. To fulfill his promise, on February 16, 2017, Trump signed a bill undoing the Stream Protection Rule signed during the Obama administration. This bill originally helped prevent coal mining from polluting waterways. Burning coal produces air pollutants such as nitrogen oxides (NO_{X}), sulfur dioxide (SO_{2}), particulate matter (PM_{X}), Black carbon, and smog. Increase of coal usage would greatly increase air pollution especially in areas surrounding the facilities many of which are located in communities of color and low-income.

=== Environmental health education ===
The education status here does not merely refer to the educational background or the highest degree people have earned, but more importantly, the environmental health education. Generally, the population with less education are more likely to be exposed to the impact of air pollution. For example, in the United States, people with a high school degree had 6.2% higher estimated exposure to PM 2.5 compared to those with a college degree. In addition to PM 2.5, people with a high school degree or lower are estimated to have at least 10% more exposure to Al, Ca, Cl, EC, SI, TI, V, and Zn when compared to people with a college degree. Therefore, environmental health education could be one of the most effective approaches to raise the public awareness of the environmental issues.

Before 2017, EPA spent more than $8.7 million annually on environmental education to increase public knowledge and awareness about current environmental issues and the consequences. The education programs promote the popularization of the necessary skills and knowledge for the public to make decisions and participate in activities that lead to the resolution of environmental challenges. In March 2017 EPA's education budget was severely reduced. The 2018 United States federal budget cut approximately $2.5 billion from the roughly 8 billion annual budget for EPA, and the budget for environmental education was cut from $8.7 million to $0.555 million, which is reduced by 94%.

== Air pollution in California ==
Poor air quality in California has been partially attributed to its wildfires. After a 23-year decline in US pollution levels through 2017, the American Lung Association's State of the Air 2022 report found an increase in pollution over the five years prior.

According to the American Lung Association's State of the Air 2024 report, California retains its position of being the state with the most metro areas on the list, with 10 of the 25 most-polluted cities.

=== Los Angeles air pollution ===
Los Angeles has the most contaminated air in the country. With a population of roughly over 10 million, the Los Angeles area is a large basin with the Pacific Ocean to the west and bounded prominently on the north and east by the San Gabriel and San Bernardino mountains. These mountains, part of the Transverse Ranges, exceed 10,000 feet in elevation and help form a natural trap, confining pollutants in the Los Angeles basin. Diesel engines, ports, motor vehicles, and industries are main sources of air pollution in Los Angeles. Frequent sunny days and low rainfall contribute to ozone formation, as well as high levels of fine particles and dust. The strong relationship between AQI and ozone levels may be found on air pollution maps.

Air pollution in Los Angeles has caused widespread concerns. In 2012, the Public Policy Institute of California (PPIC) Survey on Californians and the Environment showed that 45% of citizens in Los Angeles consider air pollution to be a "big problem", and 47% believe that the air quality of Los Angeles is worse than it was 10 years ago. In 2024, the Los Angeles-Long Beach-Riverside area ranked the 1st most ozone-polluted city, the 6th most polluted city by annual particle pollution, and the 11th most polluted city by 24-hour particle pollution.

Both ozone and particle pollution are dangerous to human health. The Environmental Protection Agency (EPA) engaged a panel of expert scientists, the Clean Air Scientific Advisory Committee, to help them assess the evidence. The EPA released their most recent review of the current research on health threat of ozone and particle pollution.

==== EPA concludes that ozone pollution poses serious health threats ====
- Causes respiratory harm (e.g. worsened asthma, worsened COPD, inflammation)
- Likely to cause early death (both short-term and long-term exposure)
- Likely to cause cardiovascular harm (e.g. heart attacks, strokes, heart disease, congestive heart failure)
- May cause harm to the central nervous system
- May cause reproductive and developmental harm

==== EPA concludes that fine particle pollution poses serious health threats ====
- Causes early death (both short-term and long-term exposure)
- Causes cardiovascular harm (e.g. heart attacks, strokes, heart disease, congestive heart failure)
- Likely to cause respiratory harm (e.g. worsened asthma, worsened COPD, inflammation)
- May cause cancer
- May cause reproductive and developmental harm

Helping the area to meet the national air quality standards and improve the health of local residents continues to be a priority for the EPA. One of EPA's highest priorities is to support the reduction of diesel emissions from ships, trucks, locomotives, and other diesel engines. In 2005, Congress authorized funding for the Diesel Emissions Reduction Act (DERA), a grant program, administered by EPA, to selectively retrofit or replace the older diesel engines most likely to impact human health. Since 2008, the DERA program has achieved impressive out outcome of improving air quality. The EPA also works with state and local partners to decrease emissions from port operations and to improve the efficient transportation of goods through the region. Both the EPA and the Port of Los Angeles are partners of the San Pedro Bay Ports Clean Air Action Plan, a sweeping plan aimed at significantly reducing the health risks posed by air pollution from port-related ships, trains, trucks, terminal equipment and harbor craft. For environmental justice, air pollution in low-income LA communities has received more attention. In 2011, the "Clean up Green up" campaign was launched to designate four low-income LA communities- Pacoima, Boyle Heights and Wilmington. This campaign aims to push green industries through incentives, including help obtaining permits and tax and utility rebates.

Although Los Angeles air pollution level had declined slightly for the last few decades, citizens in Los Angeles still suffer from high level air pollution and current levels are back to where they were 10 years ago.

=== San Francisco air pollution ===
According to a study by the EPA, the air quality in San Francisco has improved since 2013.

=== Air pollution and low socioeconomic status communities in California ===
EPA's interactive online map, "EJSCREEN", features the low socioeconomic communities across the country that are more vulnerable to air pollution and its associated health risks. As exhibited in this map, Southeast Los Angeles County neighborhoods, primarily impoverished areas in the San Joaquin Valley and Inland Empire, face a higher exposure to air pollution and environmental injustices. In such areas, those in poverty stricken areas have an unequal access to environmental health and safety resources. These poverty-stricken neighborhoods are frequently located in areas that are near freeways, hazardous facilities, and/or rail yards.

=== Instances of environmental injustice ===
==== Diabetes in Los Angeles County Latino children ====
In 2017, researchers found that diabetes in Latino children living in Los Angeles is linked to air quality. A study led by the University of Southern California was the first of its kind to follow the health and residential air pollution levels of the same children over a span of several years. The subjects of the study were overweight Latino children, between the ages of eight and fifteen, residing in areas with elevated particulate matter and nitrogen dioxide levels, air pollutants caused nearby power plants and high-volume vehicle traffic. The results demonstrated that the children possessed significantly increased risk factors for Type 2 diabetes by the time they turned eighteen, such as diminished efficiency in the insulin-secreting cells of the pancreas. The insulin resistance that results from such a condition is a direct cause of diabetes onset.

Diabetes mellitus is a disease that is characterized by the body's inability to properly regulate blood glucose (or blood sugar) levels. Prolonged levels of high blood sugar may lead to severe health complications such as heart disease, nerve damage, kidney failure, blindness, or even early death. As diabetes becomes a rising epidemic, the Center for Disease Control and Prevention estimates that up to nearly 8 million U.S. citizens may have undiagnosed diabetes or its precursor. Conventional medical findings suggest that unhealthy or calorie-dense diets, lack of physical activity, and family history are risk factors for developing the disease; however, recent studies are beginning to trace a connection between Type 2 diabetes and the external factor of air pollution. Because socioeconomic status, race, and exposure to air pollution are frequently correlated, the CDC acknowledges certain socioeconomic conditions or races as pre-existing risk factors for Type 2 diabetes, in addition to those previously listed. Statistics suggest that Hispanic people are 50% more likely to die from diabetes than whites, and studies focusing on issues of environmental injustice are able to demonstrate possible reasons for this disparity.

==== Proximity of schools to vehicle traffic in Culver City ====
The spatial arrangement of Californian communities plays a large role in determining exposure to the concentrated air pollution of the state's southern regions. In one suburb of Los Angeles, El Marino Language School sits adjacent to the ten-lane Interstate 405. Students of schools like these, often elementary-aged, are subject to dramatically increased levels of pollution from automobile emissions, including carcinogenic compounds. Health effects of traffic pollution include the onset of cardiovascular disease, asthma, impaired lung function, premature death, and a plethora of other complications. Furthermore, the incomplete development of children's sensitive respiratory systems leads to compounded effects of air pollution when compared with the health effects of the same pollution on adults.

Though the health consequences of vehicle pollution are widely recognized and some legislation has been enacted to reduce its impact, very little tangible action has actually been taken. In 2003, California passed Senate Bill No. 352, which banned the construction of new schools within 500 feet of freeways with certain exceptions. However, the bill remained largely ignored as 1 in 5 schools opened between 2014 and 2015 were still in direct violation of the ban. In 2015, the Environmental Protection Agency released a report titled "Best Practices for Reducing Near-Road Pollution Exposure at Schools", available both online and in-print. However, without any requirements regarding school siting from the U.S. Department of Education, state-funded schools are under no obligation to follow its guidelines. The reluctance of public schools to comply with safety regulations often stems from monetary limitations that encourage the use of cheap land, a dilemma that disproportionately impacts children of poorer areas; the report noted that minority and low-income students have a higher prevalence of attendance in public schools of urban areas, such as the big cities in which busy roads and schools share territory.

==== Fracking violations in Kern County school zones ====
Oil fracking is a process that involves a high pressure injection of fluid into the ground to extract oil. The adverse environmental effects of this natural gas extraction are the subject of much controversy, the primary concerns of which surround the contamination of surrounding water and air sources. These risks result when underground drinking water and surface water are exposed to discharges of the chemically infused fracking fluid due to faulty construction or operation, disposal leaks, or other unintended byproducts like the release of hazardous volatile compounds into the air. In terms of air pollution, "hydrofracking" causes detriment to both the environment and human health. Enormous quantities of methane, a greenhouse gas, escape into the ozone layer of Earth's atmosphere during the extraction process, where they accelerate the impacts of climate change. Furthermore, air contaminants like nitrogen oxides, carbon monoxide, formaldehydes, and hydrogen sulfide that are released during drilling have been shown to cause harmful effects ranging from cancer, organ failure, neurological issues, to birth defects.

In 2015, a study revealed that there are forty-five fracking sites within 1.5 miles of one junior high in the town of Shafter, one of California's top ten most polluted communities. The students of this community suffer from the state's decision to allow oil companies to continue hydraulic fracturing within close proximity of their schools. Parents observe severe and unexplainable health complications amongst their children, including asthma and epilepsy, that may be correlated with air toxins from the nearby wells. In all of Kern County, in which Shafter is located, a staggering ten school districts sit within one mile of fracking wells. The situation becomes even more problematic when the fact that Kern County is predominantly Latino in racial/ethnic composition is considered; in fact, 20% or more of its residents are foreign-born emigrants of Asia and Latin America. Some argue that the concentration of fracking sites around the community's population of color is a discriminatory practice in direct violation of California Code 11135, which states that no person shall be unlawfully subjected to discrimination by any state or state-funded agency on the basis of race or ethnic group identification.

==== Inequalities in cumulative environmental burdens among three urbanized counties in California ====
In 2012, this research used the method of cumulative environmental hazard inequality Index (CEHII), which is a model developed to environmental inequality in air pollution hazards., to analyze the environmental inequality in three counties in California: Alameda, San Diego and Los Angeles (Jason et al. 2012). In addition to frequently used air pollution parameter like NO_{2}, PM 2.5 and diesel PM, a metric of heat stress was included for the analysis because excessive heat weather comes to be an environmental problem that can threaten human health.

The result indicated that color community bear greater air pollution including NO_{2}, PM 2.5, PM 10, and heat stress compared to predominantly white and more affluent community. In San Diego County, the relative heat stress inequality was founded to be the highest. Also, significant heat stress inequality was observed in Los Angeles. The result shows that in these two counties, there was a strong positive correlation between the percentage of Non-Whites in the community and heat stress inequality. However, in Alameda county, the result indicated an opposite pattern which indicates. The community with a higher White population experience more extreme temperature exceedances. This might be explained by the fact that White population and the more affluent class in Alameda County mainly lived in the eastern area further away from the coast, which resulted in the higher heat stress exposure.

Also, the research verified that poverty status is consistent with the trend of disproportion burden of the racial-ethnic status. As the analysis was conducted according to the poverty status instead of racial-ethnic status for air pollutants NO_{2}, PM2.5, and diesel PM, the results indicated the similar result as the analysis to heat stress. Furthermore, from our data, we found a strong correlation between poverty and proportion of non-white population (Alameda: r=0.69, Los Angeles: r=0.77). After all, this research demonstrates that the air pollution is disproportionally distributed according to the socioeconomic and racial-ethnic status in the United States.

As a future direction of study, it plans to classify the inequality exists in African American, Hispanic, Asian, and other ethnic groups. Furthermore, the technique used in this research provided a way to assess environmental inequality and the results can be used to assist decision makers in efforts to address environmental inequality issues.

==== Proposed coal terminal in West Oakland ====
In February 2016, the city of Oakland publicly announced construction plans for the Oakland Bulk and Oversized Terminal, a bulk exporting facility in West Oakland. As a predominantly Latino and African-American community, the residents of West Oakland live in a community that suffers from dangerous levels of air pollution. The construction of this port and its proposed partnership with Utah's coal-mining counties would rank the city as the lead coal exporter on the West Coast. To fund such a goliath project in the face of strong resistance from city councils fighting to protect their local communities from drastically increasing pollution emissions, Utah state and county officials arranged a controversial $53 million loan. The fund, composed of taxpayer dollars intended for local projects, would allow for the annual shipping of 9 million tons of coal through Oakland and an increase in national coal exports by 19%. A movement by environmental advocates quickly grew, citing that exposure to toxic coal dust would also subject the city's residents to increased risks of bronchitis, pneumonia, heart disease, emphysema, and more.

In response, thousands of Oakland residents and environmental rights activists worked together to prevent the construction of the coal terminal. In July 2016, Oakland City Council voted to ban coal from being handled and stored in the City of Oakland. The decision marked a large victory for the newly established Department of Race and Equity, an organization designed to protect Oakland's predominantly African-American community from social and racial disparities. According to the "Toxic Wastes and Race in the United States" report issued by the East Bay Community Foundation, those living in West Oakland already encounter five times more toxic pollution per person than residents of the city of Oakland, and children living in West Oakland are seven times more likely to be hospitalized for asthma than the average child in California. The residents of West Oakland are more likely to face both decreased life expectancy and asthma-related emergency room visits. For a city already bearing a disproportionate amount of environmental burdens, the fight for a coal-free Oakland was a success for proponents of environmental justice.

== Pollution level rankings 2024 ==
Most polluted US cities by short-term particulate matter
Rank	City
1	Bakersfield, CA
2	Fresno-Madera-Hanford, CA
3	Fairbanks, AK
4	Eugene-Springfield, OR
5	Visalia, CA
6	Reno-Carson City-Fernley, NV
7	San Jose-San Francisco-Oakland, CA
8	Redding-Red Bluff, CA
9	Sacramento-Roseville, CA
10	Chico, CA

Most polluted US cities by ozone levels
Rank	City
1	Los Angeles-Long Beach, CA
2	Visalia, CA
3	Bakersfield, CA
4	Fresno-Madera-Hanford, CA
5	Phoenix-Mesa, AZ
6	Denver-Aurora, CO
7	Sacramento-Roseville, CA
8	San Diego-Chula Vista-Carlsbad, CA
9	Salt Lake City-Provo-Orem, UT
10	Houston-The Woodlands, TX

Most polluted US cities by year-round particulate matter
Rank	City
1	Bakersfield, CA
2	Visalia, CA
3	Fresno-Madera-Hanford, CA
4	Eugene-Springfield, OR
5	San Jose-San Francisco-Oakland, CA
6	Los Angeles-Long Beach, CA
7	Sacramento-Roseville, CA
8	Medford-Grants Pass, OR
9	Cleveland-Akron-Canton, OH
10	Fairbanks, AK

== See also ==
- National Ambient Air Quality Standards
- Spare the Air program (California)
- Greenhouse gas emissions by the United States
- Climate change in the United States
- Air quality in Utah
- List of least polluted cities by particulate matter concentration
