= Fuel =

Material used to create heat and energy

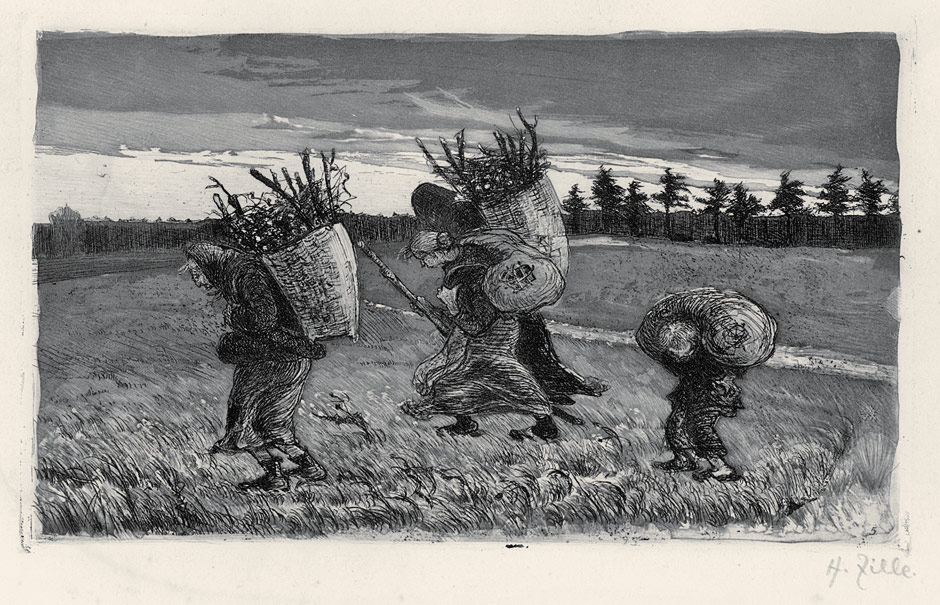
Firewood was one of the first fuels used by humans.

A fuel is any material that can react with other substances to release energy as thermal energy or to be used for work. The concept was originally applied solely to those materials capable of releasing chemical energy but has since also been applied to other sources of heat energy, such as nuclear energy (via nuclear fission and nuclear fusion).

The heat energy released by reactions of fuels can be converted into mechanical energy via a heat engine. Other times, the heat itself is valued for warmth, cooking, or industrial processes, as well as the illumination that accompanies combustion. Fuels are also used in the cells of organisms in a process known as cellular respiration, where organic molecules are oxidized to release usable energy. Hydrocarbons and related organic molecules are by far the most common source of fuel used by humans, but other substances, including radioactive metals, are also utilized.

Fuels are contrasted with other substances or devices storing potential energy, such as those that directly release electrical energy (such as batteries and capacitors) or mechanical energy (such as flywheels, springs, compressed air, or water in a reservoir).

== History ==
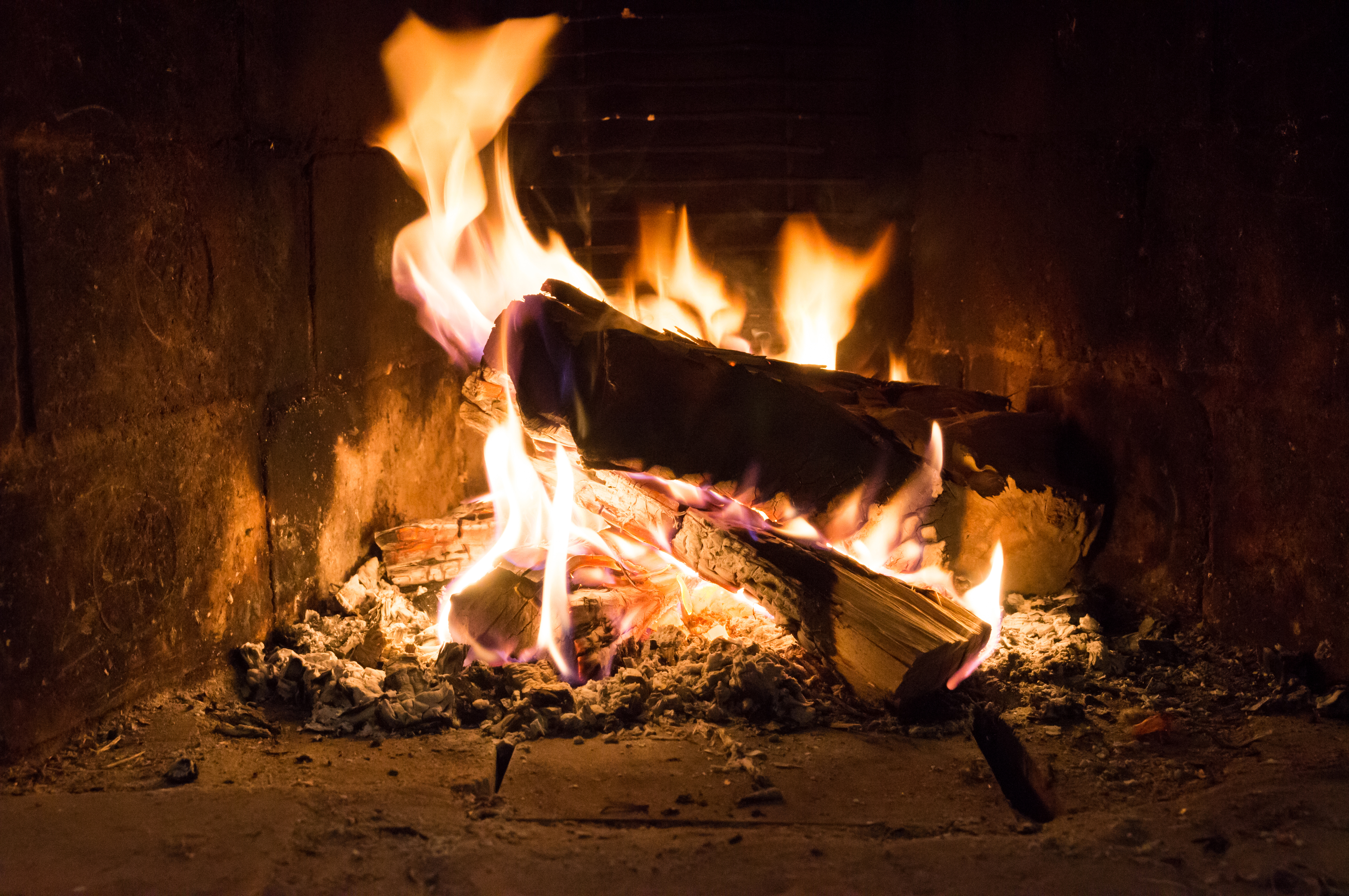
Wood as fuel for combustion

The first known use of fuel was the combustion of firewood by Homo erectus nearly two million years ago. Throughout most of human history only fuels derived from plants or animal fat were used by humans. Charcoal, a wood derivative, has been used since at least 6,000 BCE for melting metals. It was only supplanted by coke, derived from coal, as European forests started to become depleted around the 18th century. Charcoal briquettes are now commonly used as a fuel for barbecue cooking.

Crude oil was distilled by Persian chemists, with clear descriptions given in Arabic handbooks such as those of Muhammad ibn Zakarīya Rāzi. He described the process of distilling crude oil/petroleum into kerosene, as well as other hydrocarbon compounds, in his Kitab al-Asrar (Book of Secrets). Kerosene was also produced during the same period from oil shale and bitumen by heating the rock to extract the oil, which was then distilled. Rāzi also gave the first description of a kerosene lamp using crude mineral oil, referring to it as the "naffatah".

The streets of Baghdad were paved with tar, derived from petroleum that became accessible from natural fields in the region. In the 9th century, oil fields were exploited in the area around modern Baku, Azerbaijan. These fields were described by the Arab geographer Abu al-Hasan 'Alī al-Mas'ūdī in the 10th century, and by Marco Polo in the 13th century, who described the output of those wells as hundreds of shiploads.

With the development of the steam engine in the United Kingdom in 1769, coal came into more common use, the combustion of which releases chemical energy that can be used to turn water into steam. Coal was later used to drive ships and locomotives. By the 19th century, gas extracted from coal was being used for street lighting in London. In the 20th and 21st centuries, the primary use of coal is to generate electricity, providing 40% of the world's electrical power supply in 2005.

Coal use expanded during the Industrial Revolution, particularly as steam engines provided power for factories and transport. Over time, coal, oil and natural gas came to be used for electricity generation, heating, transport and industry. Burning these fuels releases carbon dioxide, which contributes to global warming. Efforts to reduce greenhouse gas emissions have led to policies and technologies aimed at reducing fossil fuel use, although it remains a major source of energy.

Currently the trend has been towards renewable fuels, such as biofuels like alcohols.

== Chemical ==
Chemical fuels are substances that release energy by reacting with substances around them, most notably by the process of combustion.

Chemical fuels are divided in two ways. First, by their physical properties, as a solid, liquid or gas. Secondly, on the basis of their occurrence: primary (natural fuel) and secondary (artificial fuel). Thus, a general classification of chemical fuels is:

General types of chemical fuels
	Primary (natural)	Secondary (artificial)
Solid fuels	wood, coal, peat, dung, etc.	coke, charcoal
Liquid fuels	petroleum	diesel, gasoline, kerosene, LPG, coal tar, naphtha, ethanol
Gaseous fuels	natural gas	hydrogen, propane, methane, coal gas, water gas, blast furnace gas, coke oven gas, CNG

=== Solid fuel ===
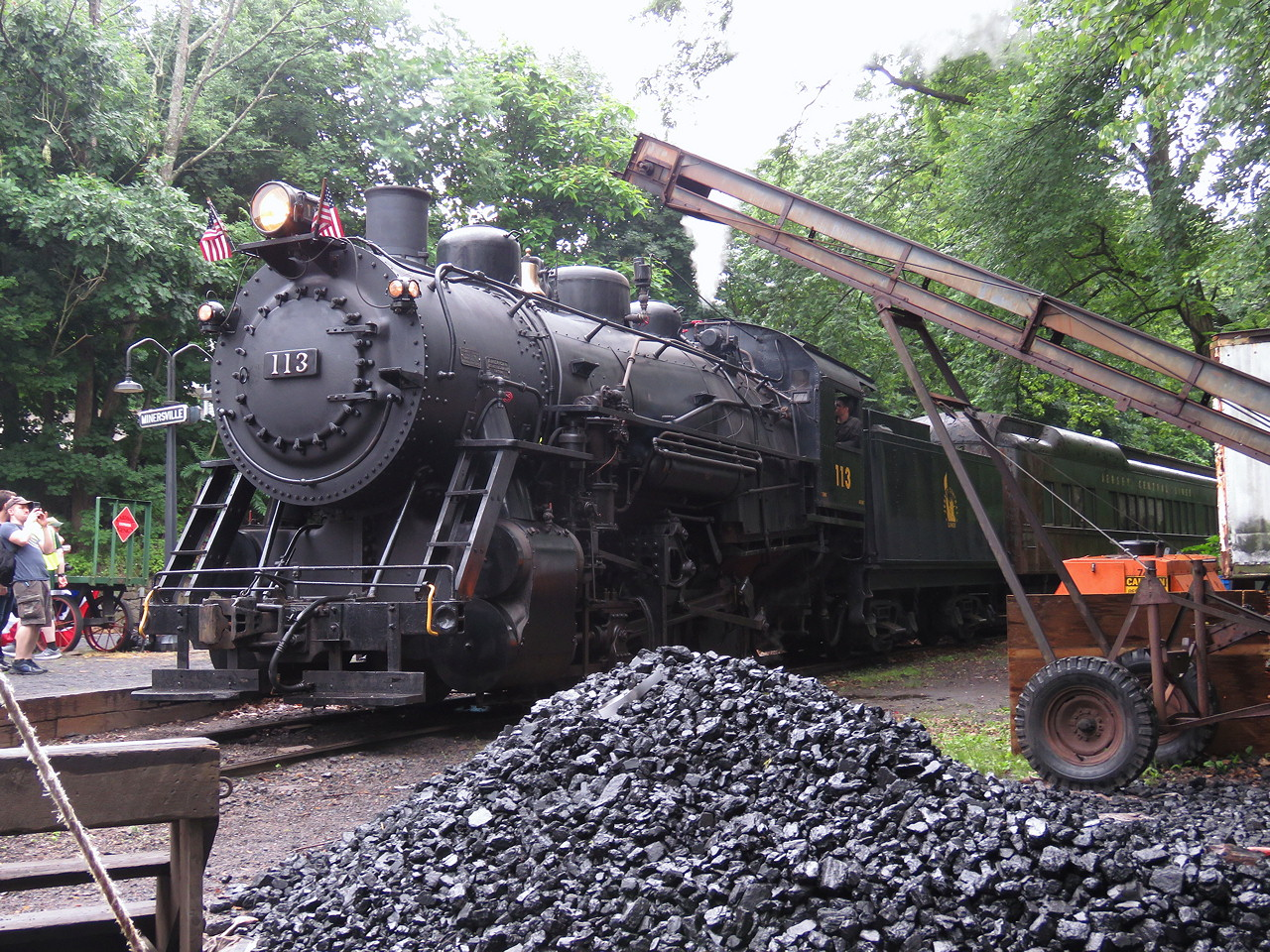
Coal is a solid fuel

Solid fuel refers to various types of solid material that are used as fuel to produce energy and provide heating, usually released through combustion. Solid fuels include wood, charcoal, peat, coal, hexamine fuel tablets, and pellets made from wood (see wood pellets), corn, wheat, rye and other grains. Solid-fuel rocket technology also uses solid fuel (see solid propellants). Solid fuels have been used by humanity for many years to create fire. Coal was the fuel source which enabled the Industrial Revolution, from firing furnaces, to running steam engines. Wood was also extensively used to run steam locomotives. Both peat and coal are still used in electricity generation today. The use of some solid fuels (e.g. coal) is restricted or prohibited in some urban areas, due to unsafe levels of toxic emissions. The use of other solid fuels as wood is decreasing as heating technology and the availability of good quality fuel improves. In some areas, smokeless coal is often the only solid fuel used. In Ireland, peat briquettes are used as smokeless fuel. They are also used to start a coal fire.

=== Liquid fuels ===
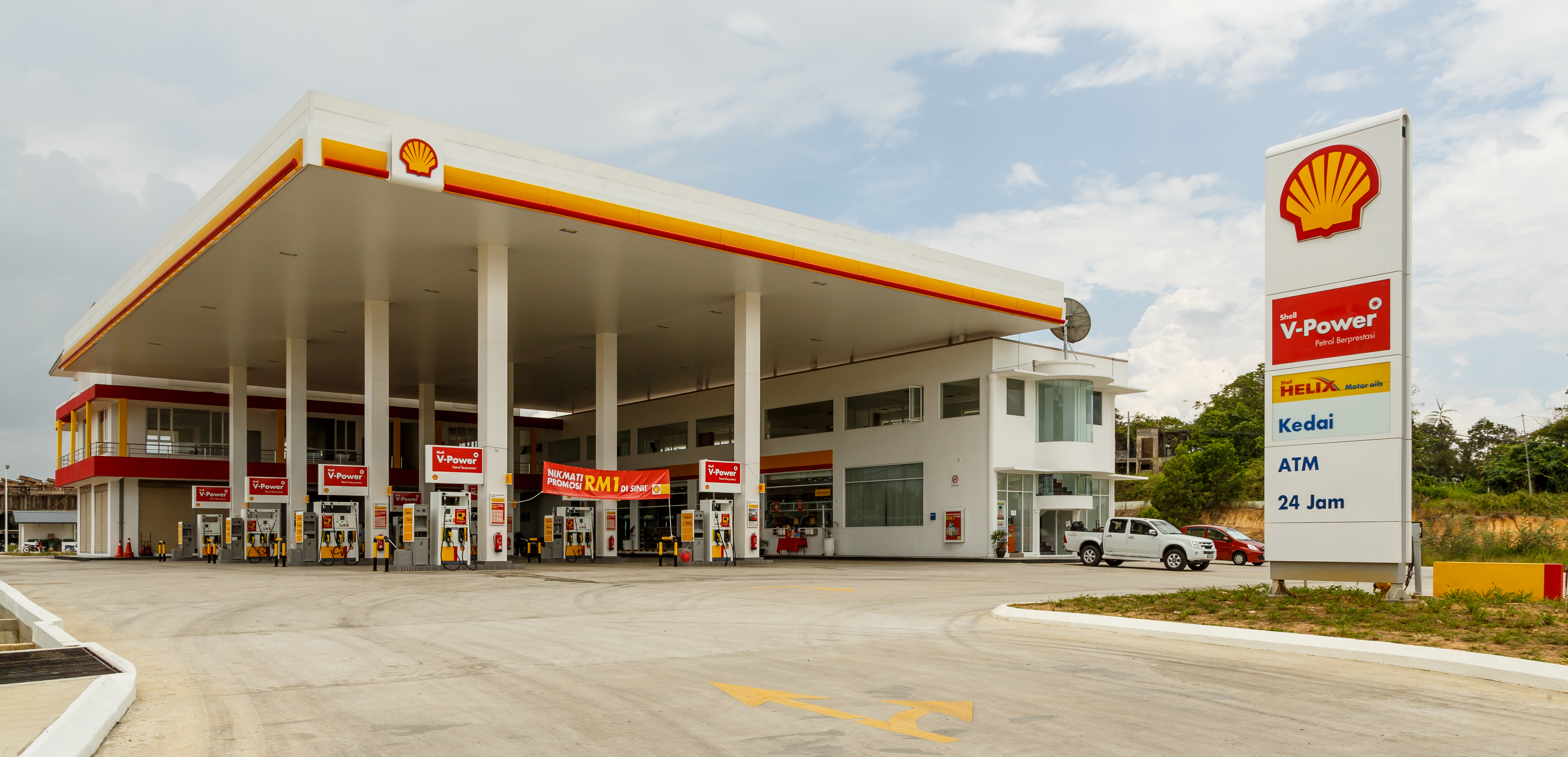
A filling station

Liquid fuels are combustible or energy-generating molecules that can be harnessed to create mechanical energy, usually producing kinetic energy. They must also take the shape of their container; the fumes of liquid fuels are flammable, not the fluids.

Most liquid fuels in widespread use are derived from the fossilized remains of dead plants and animals by exposure to heat and pressure inside the Earth's crust. However, there are several types, such as hydrogen fuel (for automotive uses), ethanol, jet fuel and bio-diesel, which are all categorized as liquid fuels. Emulsified fuels of oil in water, such as orimulsion, have been developed as a way to make heavy oil fractions usable as liquid fuels. Many liquid fuels play a primary role in transportation and the economy.

Some common properties of liquid fuels are that they are easy to transport and can be handled easily. They are also relatively easy to use for all engineering applications and in home use. Fuels like kerosene are rationed in some countries, for example in government-subsidized shops in India for home use.

Conventional diesel is similar to gasoline in that it is a mixture of aliphatic hydrocarbons extracted from petroleum. Kerosene is used in kerosene lamps and as a fuel for cooking, heating, and small engines. Natural gas, composed chiefly of methane, can only exist as a liquid at very low temperatures (regardless of pressure), which limits its direct use as a liquid fuel in most applications. LP gas is a mixture of propane and butane, both of which are easily compressible gases under standard atmospheric conditions. It offers many of the advantages of compressed natural gas (CNG) but is denser than air, does not burn as cleanly, and is much more easily compressed. Commonly used for cooking and space heating, LP gas and compressed propane are seeing increased use in motorized vehicles. Propane is the third most commonly used motor fuel globally.

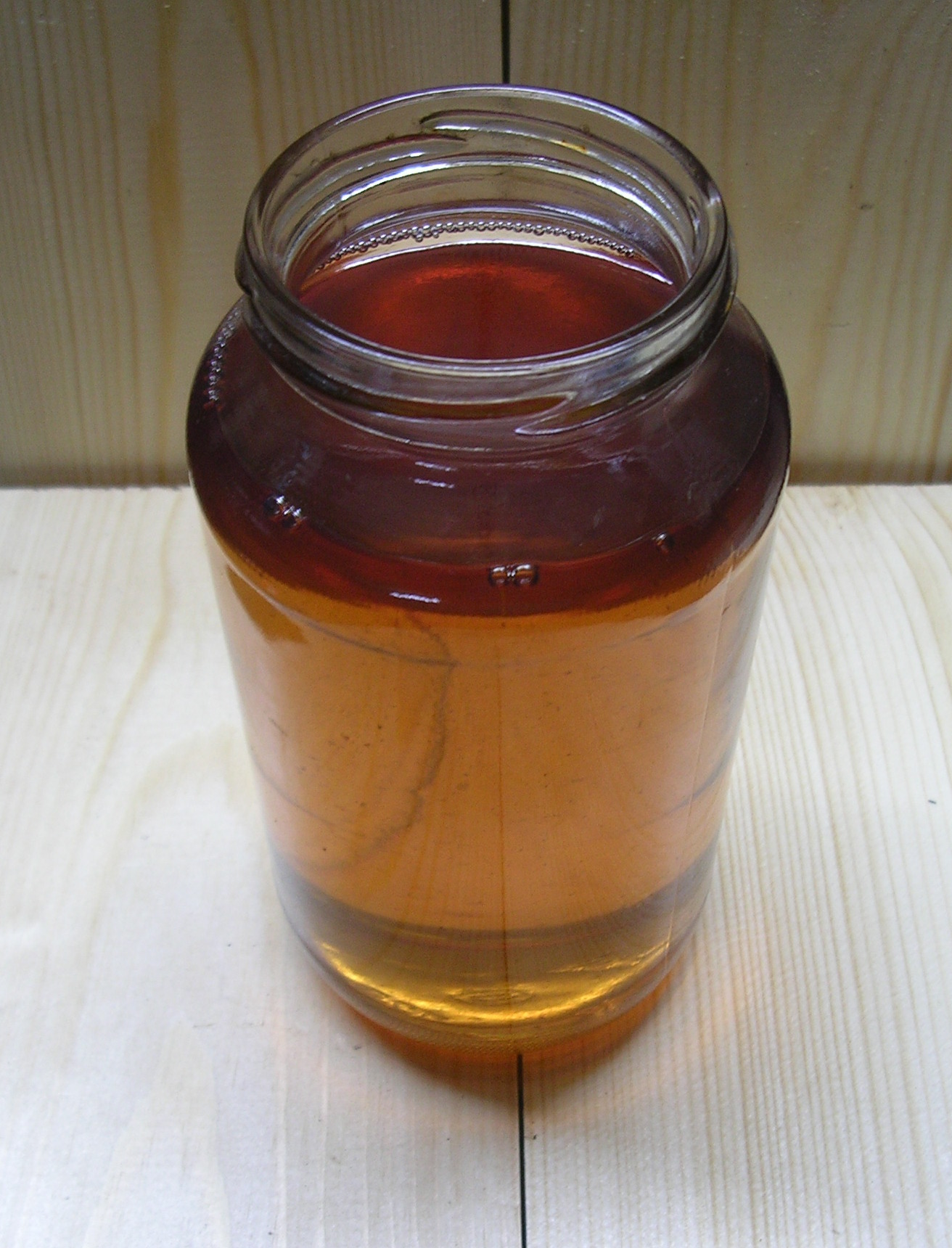
Locomotive diesel

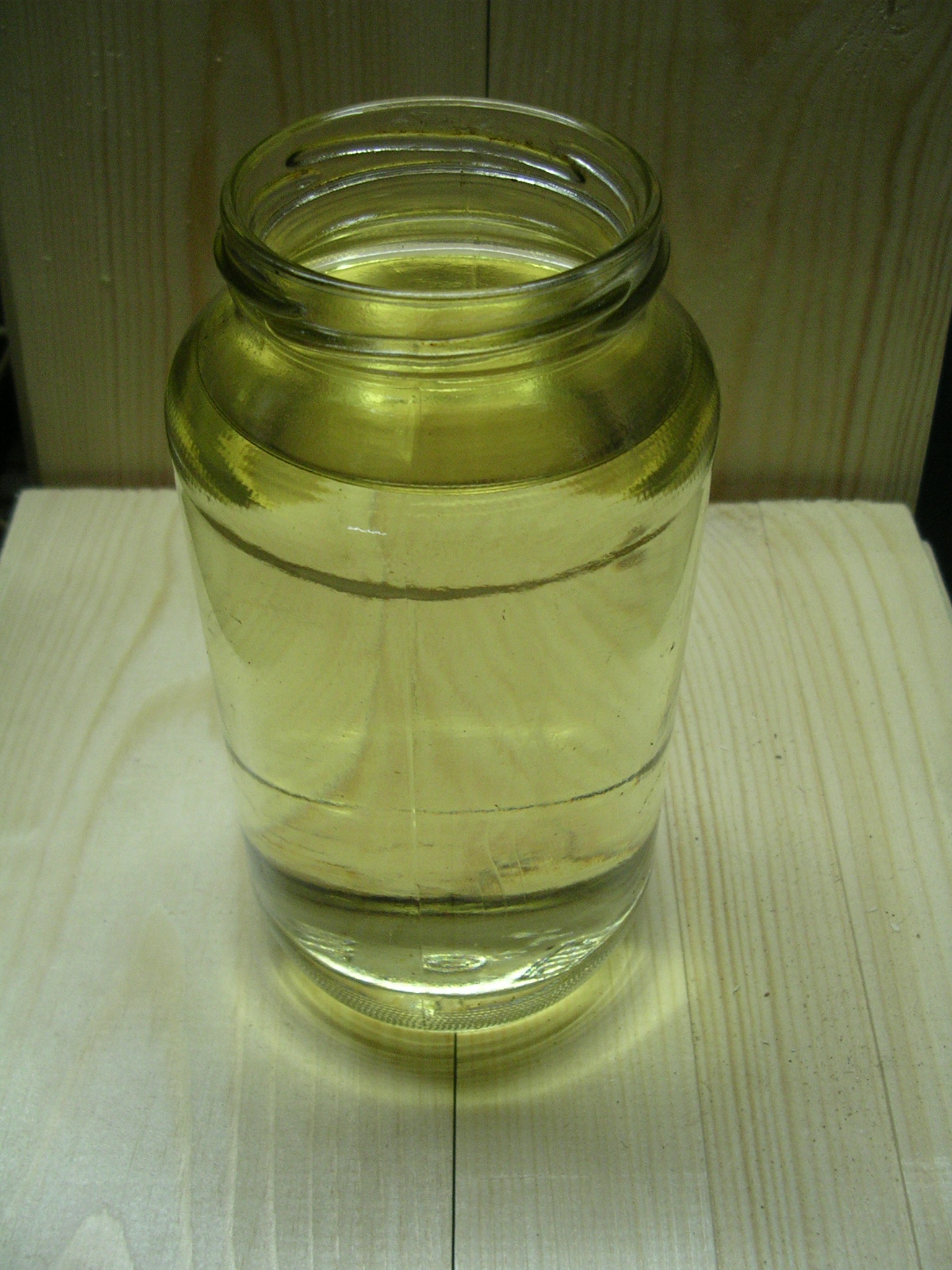
Gasoline

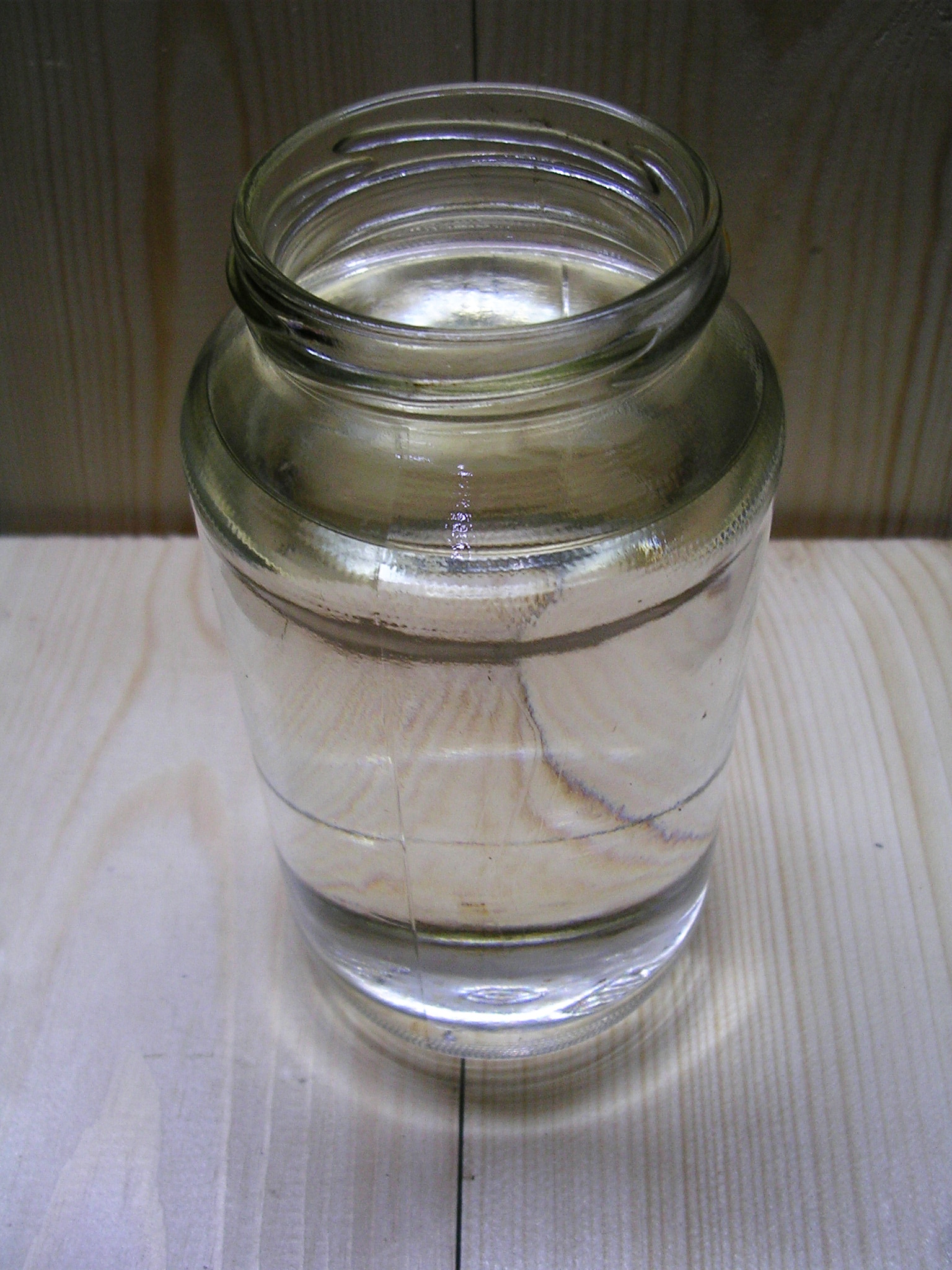
Kerosene

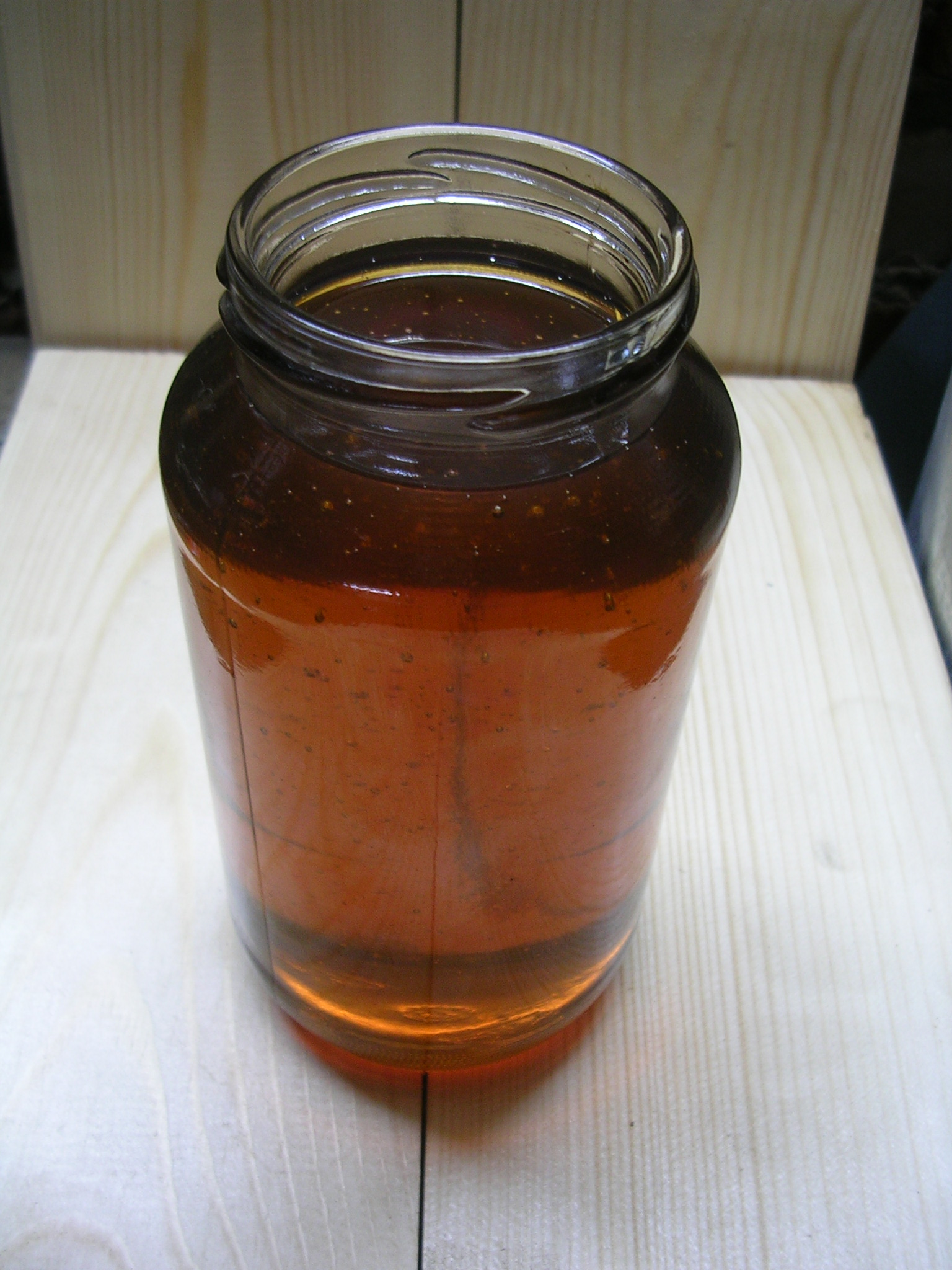
Petroleum based motor oil

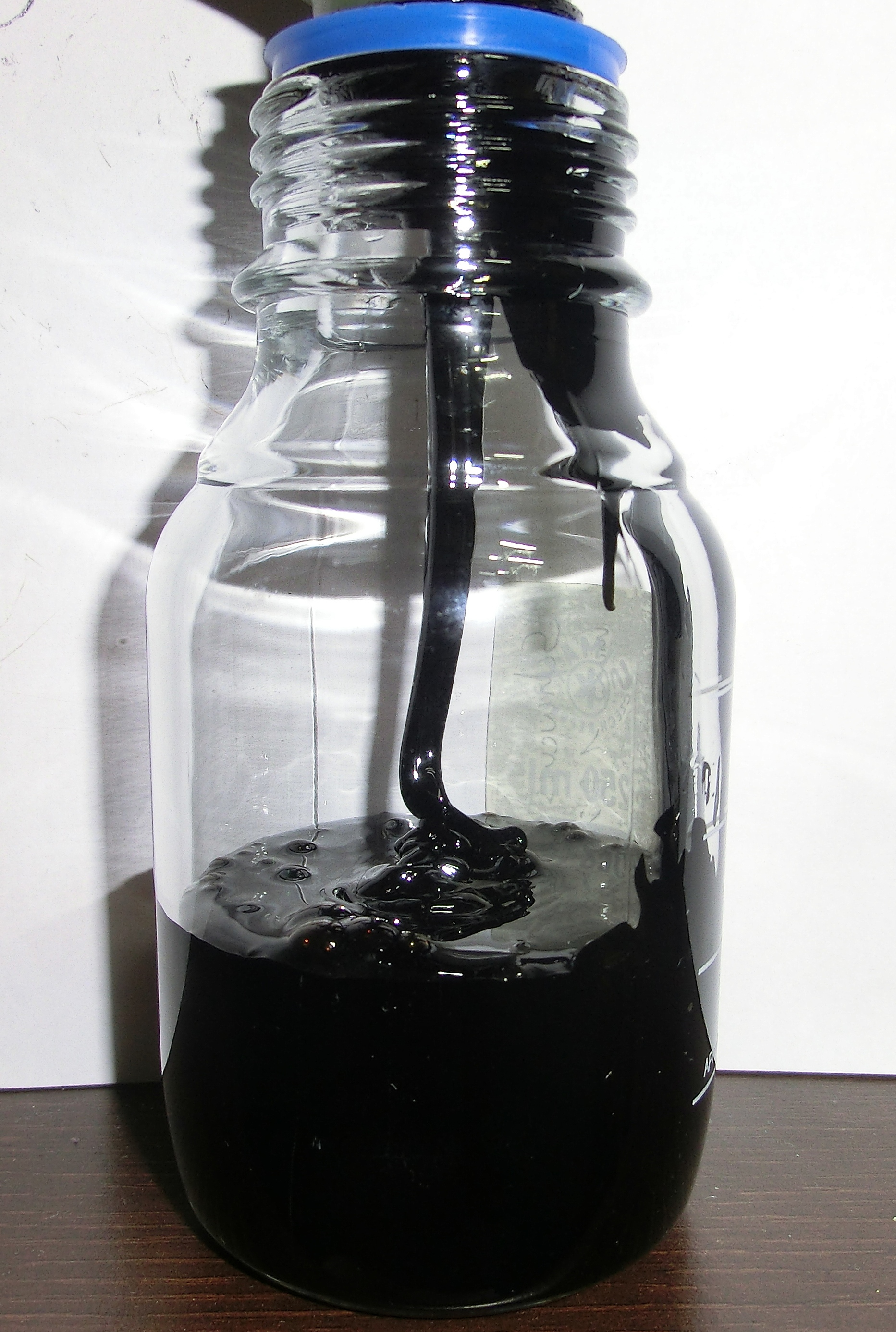
Residual fuel oil or Bunker C oil

=== Fuel gas ===
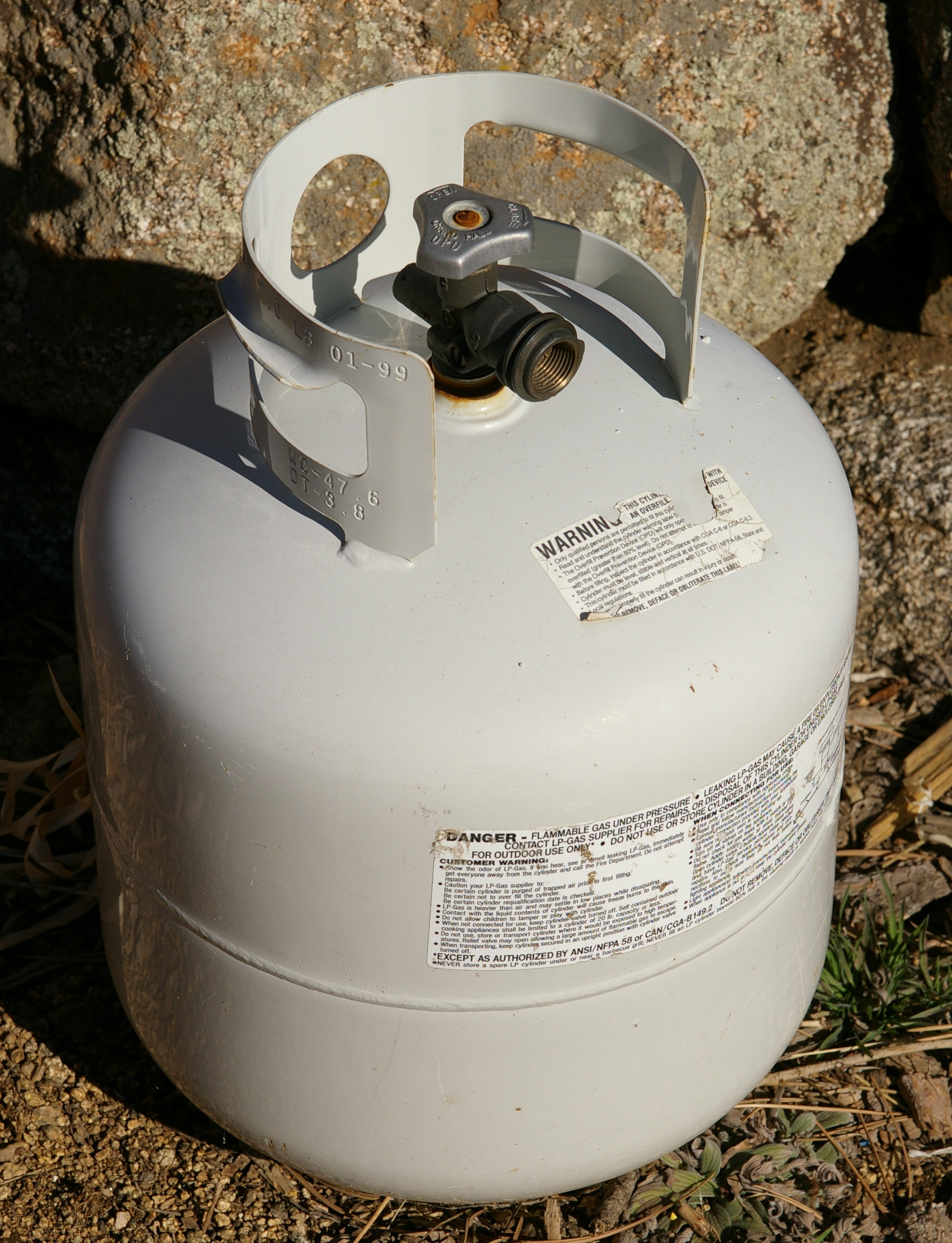
A 20-pound (9.1 kg) propane cylinder

Fuel gas is any one of a number of fuels that are gaseous under ordinary conditions. Fuel gases are gaseous fuels that commonly consist of hydrocarbons (e.g., methane and propane, hydrogen, carbon monoxide, or mixtures of these components. Such gases are sources of potential heat energy or light energy that can be readily transmitted and distributed through pipes from the point of origin directly to the place of consumption. Fuel gas is contrasted with liquid fuels and from solid fuels, though some fuel gases are liquefied for storage or transport. While their gaseous nature can be advantageous, avoiding the difficulty of transporting solid fuel and the dangers of spillage inherent in liquid fuels, it can also be dangerous. It is possible for a fuel gas to be undetected and collect in certain areas, leading to the risk of a gas explosion. For this reason, odorizers are added to most fuel gases so that they may be detected by a distinct smell. The most common type of fuel gas in current use is natural gas.

=== Biofuels ===
Biofuel can be broadly defined as solid, liquid, or gas fuel consisting of, or derived from biomass. Biomass can also be used directly for heating or power—known as biomass fuel. Biofuel can be produced from any carbon source that can be replenished rapidly e.g. plants. Many different plants and plant-derived materials are used for biofuel manufacture.

Perhaps the earliest fuel employed by humans is wood. Evidence shows controlled fire was used up to 1.5 million years ago at Swartkrans, South Africa. It is unknown which hominid species first used fire, as both Australopithecus and an early species of Homo were present at the sites. As a fuel, wood has remained in use up until the present day, although it has been superseded for many purposes by other sources. Wood has an energy density of 10–20 MJ/kg.

Recently biofuels have been developed for use in automotive transport (for example bioethanol and biodiesel), but there is widespread public debate about how carbon neutral these fuels are.

=== Fossil fuels ===
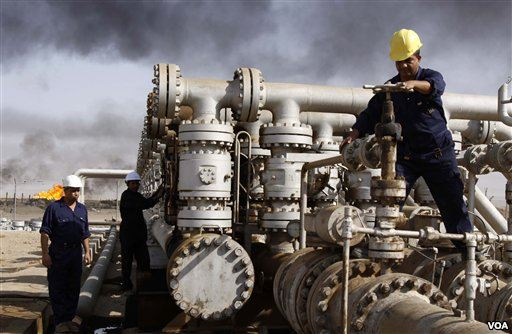
Extraction of petroleum

Fossil fuels are hydrocarbons, primarily coal and petroleum (liquid petroleum or natural gas), formed from the fossilized remains of ancient plants and animals by exposure to high heat and pressure in the absence of oxygen in the Earth's crust over hundreds of millions of years. Commonly, the term fossil fuel also includes hydrocarbon-containing natural resources that are not derived entirely from biological sources, such as tar sands. These latter sources are properly known as mineral fuels.

Fossil fuels contain high percentages of carbon and include coal, petroleum, and natural gas. They range from volatile materials with low carbon:hydrogen ratios like methane, to liquid petroleum to nonvolatile materials composed of almost pure carbon, like anthracite coal. Methane can be found in hydrocarbon fields, alone, associated with oil, or in the form of methane clathrates. Fossil fuels formed from the fossilized remains of dead plants by exposure to heat and pressure in the Earth's crust over millions of years. This biogenic theory was first introduced by German scholar Georg Agricola in 1556 and later by Mikhail Lomonosov in the 18th century.

It was estimated by the Energy Information Administration that in 2007 primary sources of energy consisted of petroleum 36.0%, coal 27.4%, natural gas 23.0%, amounting to an 86.4% share for fossil fuels in primary energy consumption in the world. Non-fossil sources in 2006 included hydroelectric 6.3%, nuclear 8.5%, and others (geothermal, solar, tidal, wind, wood, waste) amounting to 0.9%. World energy consumption was growing about 2.3% per year.

Fossil fuels are non-renewable resources because they take millions of years to form, and reserves are being depleted much faster than new ones are being made. So we must conserve these fuels and use them judiciously. The production and use of fossil fuels raise environmental concerns. A global movement toward the generation of renewable energy is therefore under way to help meet increased energy needs. The burning of fossil fuels produces around 21.3 billion tonnes (21.3 gigatonnes) of carbon dioxide (CO_{2}) per year, but it is estimated that natural processes can only absorb about half of that amount, so there is a net increase of 10.65 billion tonnes of atmospheric carbon dioxide per year (one tonne of atmospheric carbon is equivalent to 44/12 (this is the ratio of the molecular/atomic weights) or 3.7 tonnes of CO_{2}. Carbon dioxide is one of the greenhouse gases that enhances radiative forcing and contributes to global warming, causing the average surface temperature of the Earth to rise in response, which the vast majority of climate scientists agree will cause major adverse effects. Fuels are a source of energy.

The International Energy Agency (IEA) predicts that fossil fuel prices will decline, with oil stabilizing around $75 to $80 per barrel as electric vehicle adoption surges and renewable energy expands. Additionally, the IEA anticipates a notable increase in liquefied natural gas capacity, enhancing Europe's energy diversification.

=== Energy ===
The amount of energy from different types of fuel depends on the stoichiometric ratio, the chemically correct air and fuel ratio to ensure complete combustion of fuel, and its specific energy, the energy per unit mass.

Energy capacities of common types of fuel
Fuel type	Specific energy (MJ/kg)	Air–fuel ratio (stoichiometric)	Energy @ λ=1 (MJ/kg_{(Air)})
Diesel	48	14.5 : 1	3.310
Ethanol	26.4	9 : 1	2.933
Gasoline	46.4	14.7 : 1	3.156
Hydrogen	142	34.3 : 1	4.140
Kerosene	46	15.6 : 1	2.949
LPG	46.4	17.2 : 1	2.698
Methanol	19.7	6.47 : 1	3.045
Methane	55.5	17.2 : 1	3.219
Nitromethane	11.63	1.7 : 1	6.841

Notes

1 MJ ≈ 0.28 kWh ≈ 0.37 HPh.

(The fuel-air ratio (FAR) is the reciprocal of the air-fuel ratio (AFR).)

λ is the air-fuel equivalence ratio, and λ=1 means that it is assumed that the fuel and the oxidising agent (oxygen in air) are present in exactly the correct proportions so that they are both fully consumed in the reaction.

== Nuclear ==
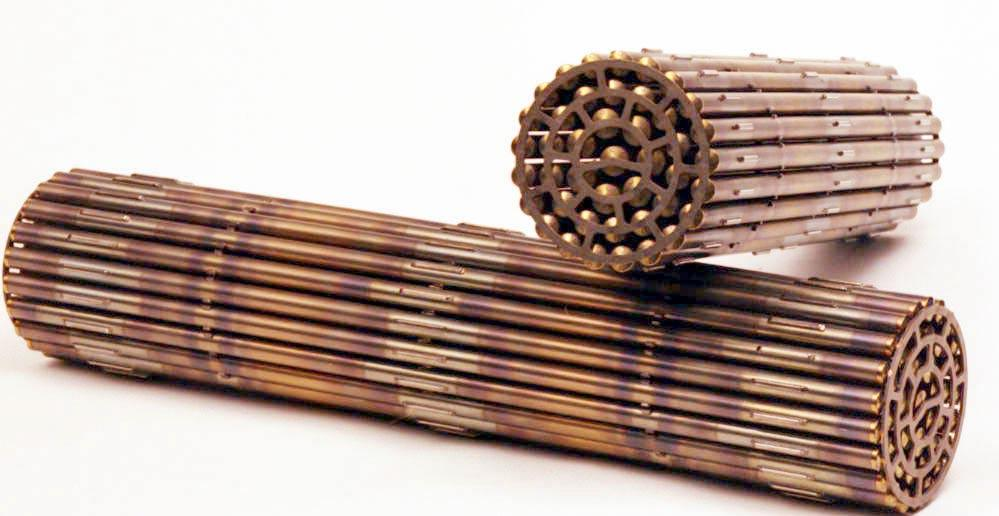
Two CANDU ("CANada Deuterium Uranium") fuel bundles, each about 50 cm long and 10 cm in diameter

Nuclear fuel is any material that is consumed to derive nuclear energy. In theory, a wide variety of substances could be a nuclear fuel, as they can be made to release nuclear energy under the right conditions. However, the materials commonly referred to as nuclear fuels are those that will produce energy without being placed under extreme duress. Nuclear fuel can be "burned" by nuclear fission (splitting nuclei apart) or fusion (combining nuclei together) to derive nuclear energy. "Nuclear fuel" can refer to the fuel itself, or to physical objects (for example bundles composed of fuel rods) composed of the fuel material, mixed with structural, neutron moderating, or neutron-reflecting materials.

Nuclear fuel has the highest energy density of all practical fuel sources.

=== Fission ===
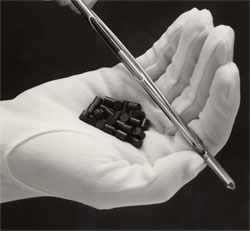
Nuclear fuel pellets are used to release nuclear energy.

The most common type of nuclear fuel used by humans is heavy fissile elements that can be made to undergo nuclear fission chain reactions in a nuclear fission reactor; nuclear fuel can refer to the material or to physical objects (for example fuel bundles composed of fuel rods) composed of the fuel material, perhaps mixed with structural, neutron moderating, or neutron reflecting materials.

When some of these fuels are struck by neutrons, they are in turn capable of emitting neutrons when they break apart. This makes possible a self-sustaining chain reaction that releases energy at a controlled rate in a nuclear reactor, or at a very rapid uncontrolled rate in a nuclear weapon.

The most common fissile nuclear fuels are uranium-235 (^{235}U) and plutonium-239 (^{239}Pu). The actions of mining, refining, purifying, using, and ultimately disposing of nuclear fuel together make up the nuclear fuel cycle. Not all types of nuclear fuels create energy from nuclear fission. Plutonium-238 and some other elements are used to produce small amounts of nuclear energy by radioactive decay in radioisotope thermoelectric generators and other types of atomic batteries.

=== Fusion ===
In contrast to fission, some light nuclides such as tritium (^{3}H) can be used as fuel for nuclear fusion. This involves two or more nuclei combining into larger nuclei. Fuels that produce energy by this method are currently not utilized by humans, but they are the main source of fuel for stars. Fusion fuels are light elements such as hydrogen whose nuclei will combine easily. Energy is required to start fusion by raising the temperature so high that nuclei can collide together with enough energy that they stick together before repelling due to electric charge. This process is called fusion and it can give out energy.

In stars that undergo nuclear fusion, fuel consists of atomic nuclei that can release energy by the absorption of a proton or neutron. In most stars the fuel is provided by hydrogen, which can combine to form helium through the proton-proton chain reaction or by the CNO cycle. When the hydrogen fuel is exhausted, nuclear fusion can continue with progressively heavier elements, although the net energy released is lower because of the smaller difference in nuclear binding energy. Once iron-56 or nickel-56 nuclei are produced, no further energy can be obtained by nuclear fusion as these have the highest nuclear binding energies. Any nucleii heavier than ^{56}Fe and ^{56}Ni would thus absorb energy instead of giving it off when fused. Therefore, fusion stops and the star dies. In attempts by humans, fusion is only carried out with hydrogen (^{2}H (deuterium) or ^{3}H (tritium)) to form helium-4 as this reaction gives out the most net energy. Electric confinement (ITER), inertial confinement (heating by laser) and heating by strong electric currents are the popular methods.

== Liquid fuels for transportation ==
Most transportation fuels are liquids, because vehicles usually require high energy density. This occurs naturally in liquids and solids. High energy density can also be provided by an internal combustion engine. These engines require clean-burning fuels. The fuels that are easiest to burn cleanly are typically liquids and gases. Thus, liquids meet the requirements of being both energy-dense and clean-burning. In addition, liquids (and gases) can be pumped, which means handling is easily mechanized, and thus less laborious. As there is a general movement towards a low carbon economy, the use of liquid fuels such as hydrocarbons is coming under scrutiny.

== See also ==
- Alcohol fuel
- Algae fuel
- Alternative fuels
- Ammonia
- Bitumen-based fuel
- Cryogenic fuel
- Electrofuel
- Filling station
- Fossil fuel phase-out
- Fuel card
- Fuel cell
- Fuel container
- Fuel management systems
- Fuel oil
- Fuel poverty
- Hydrogen economy
- Hydrotreated vegetable oil
- Hypergolic fuel
- List of energy topics
- Low-carbon economy
- Marine fuel management
- Propellant
- Recycled fuel
- Refuse-derived fuel
- World energy resources and consumption

== Footnotes ==
=== Works cited ===
- IPCC (2013). Stocker, T. F.; Qin, D.; Plattner, G.-K.; Tignor, M.; et al. (eds.). Climate Change 2013: The Physical Science Basis (PDF). Contribution of Working Group I to the Fifth Assessment Report of the Intergovernmental Panel on Climate Change. Cambridge, UK & New York: Cambridge University Press. ISBN 978-1-107-05799-9.. AR5 Climate Change 2013: The Physical Science Basis — IPCC
  - IPCC (2013). "Summary for Policymakers" (PDF). IPCC AR5 WG1 2013.
- IPCC (2018). Masson-Delmotte, V.; Zhai, P.; Pörtner, H.-O.; Roberts, D.; et al. (eds.). Global Warming of 1.5°C. An IPCC Special Report on the impacts of global warming of 1.5°C above pre-industrial levels and related global greenhouse gas emission pathways, in the context of strengthening the global response to the threat of climate change, sustainable development, and efforts to eradicate poverty (PDF). Intergovernmental Panel on Climate Change. Global Warming of 1.5 °C —.
  - Allen, M. R.; Dube, O. P.; Solecki, W.; Aragón-Durand, F.; et al. (2018). "Chapter 1: Framing and Context" (PDF). IPCC SR15 2018. pp. 49–91.
