= Air quality and EU legislation =

Since the late 1970s, the European Union's (EU) policy has been to develop and drive appropriate measures to improve air quality throughout the EU. The control of emissions from mobile sources, improving fuel quality and promoting and integrating environmental protection requirements into the transport and energy sector are part of these aims.

The main advising agency of the EU is the European Environment Agency (EEA). It came into force in 1993, after the decision to locate the EEA in Copenhagen. Work started in earnest in 1994. The EEA's mandate is to help the community and member countries make informed decisions about improving the environment and integrating environmental considerations into economic policies and to coordinate the European environment information and observation network (Eionet). Eionet is a partnership network across member states involving approximately 1000 experts and more than 350 national institutions. The network supports the collection and organization of data and the development and dissemination of information concerning Europe's environment.

== Background ==
The first serious attempt at an environmental harm treaty was the 1992 Framework Convention on Climate Change. Earlier attempts, such as the 1979 Convention on Long-range Transboundary Air Pollution and the 1985 Convention for the Protection of the Ozone Layer, turned out to be largely futile. (Birnie et al., 2009).

The genesis of air quality within the EU is the Council Directive 96/62/EC on ambient air quality assessment and management which is commonly referred to as the Air Quality Framework Directive. It described the approach as to how air quality would be assessed and managed in the EU member states. It listed the pollutants for which air quality standards and objectives would be developed and specified in legislation (EU, 1996). There were four ‘daughter’ directives for specified pollutants; however as shown in the Cleaner Air For Europe Directive (CAFE), 2008/50/EC below, daughter directives 1, 2 and 3 were subsumed into CAFE, with daughter directive 4 to be subsumed at a later stage (EPA, 2016).

Subsequent to the Gothenburg Protocol, the United Nations Economic Commission for Europe (UNECE) was agreed upon in December 1999, which focused on reducing, by 2010, the air concentrations of four air pollutants, namely sulfur dioxide (to be reduced by 63%), nitrogen oxides (41%), volatile organic compounds (40%) and ammonia (17%), leading the EU to introduce the 2001/81/EC Directive on national emissions ceilings. This became law in Ireland by way of the European Communities (National Emissions Ceilings) Regulations 2004. The Environmental Protection Agency was assigned the status of competent authority to assess ambient air quality, approving air measuring devices, etc. (Menzies, 2016).

The Cleaner Air For Europe Directive, 2008/50/EC or CAFE as it is known, sets out the need to ascertain the ambient air qualities, assessing for comparison and informing the public where need be. In order to do this the legislation sets out the need for member states to break their countries into zones and agglomerations (collections of people). Ireland is broken into 4 zones, A, B, C and D representing Dublin, Cork, small towns/cities and rural areas respectively (Menzies, 2016). CAFE, like that of the 2001/81/EC Directive, determines that additional pollutants will be measured and reduced, namely:

- Carbon monoxide
- PM_{10} and PM_{2.5}s (particulate matter)
- Lead
- Benzene
- Sulfur dioxide
- Nitrogen dioxide

The CAFE Directive was transposed into Irish legislation by the Air Quality Standards Regulations 2011 (S.I. No. 180 of 2011) which in turn replaced the Air Quality Standards Regulations 2002 (S.I. No. 271 of 2002), the Ozone in Ambient Air Regulations 2004 (S.I. No. 53 of 2004) and S.I. No. 33 of 1999 - Environmental Protection Agency Act, 1992 (Ambient Air Quality Assessment and Management) Regulations. (EPA, 2016).

== Monitoring ==
Among the many reasons that something had to be done was the importance of reducing the greenhouse gases that contribute to global warming. Before the Industrial Revolution era of the late 1700s, carbon dioxide could be measured in the atmosphere at around 280 parts per million (ppm), whereas in 2005 it was found to be 379 ppm. Methane, similarly in the same period, was 715 ppm reaching up to 1774 ppm. This is significant because methane has a potential for global warming 70% more than CO_{2} (Birnie et al., 2009, Bodansky et al., 2007).

The Treaty of Amsterdam which came into force in 1999 set out new objectives such as environmental protection in its own right as opposed to being a subset of economic development. Article 6 ensures that "environmental protection requirements must be integrated into the definition and implementation of Community policies" (Asser Institute, 2016) which in effect meant that it went from "semi-obscurity" in previous environmental provisions to an Article in the core principles of the Treaty, the only constitutional document in the World to do so (Macrory, 2010). In fact the 2000 EU Charter of Rights alludes to the concept in Article 37: "[a] high level of environmental protection and the improvement of the quality of the environment must..." This was copper fastened in the 2007 Lisbon (EU Reform) Treaty, Article 7 by virtue of Article 6 of the same Treaty which affords the integration concept with the same value/status as the Treaties themselves (Macrory, 2010).

== Irish legislation ==
The Environmental Protection Agency is the designated competent authority for the implementation of all Irish and EU ambient air quality legislation. The EPA manages the national ambient air quality monitoring network – assisted in its role of implementing this legislation by the local authorities, many of whom carry out ambient air quality monitoring – while also measuring the levels of a number of atmospheric pollutants (see bullet points above). For example, the EPA utilizes several state and semi-state buildings, such as fire stations and guard stations, around the Greater Dublin area to gather data in real time and on a collected basis.

Domestic solid fuel use such as coal and turf is the other main source of air pollution in Ireland (outside Greater Dublin) and particularly impacts air quality in areas where the sale of coal is permitted. When the Air Pollution (Marketing, Sale and Distribution of Fuel) Regulations were enacted in 1990, this banned the sale of bituminous fuels in the Greater Dublin area. This led to an immediate reduction in smoke levels, thus offering the potential for better health. According to the Dublin Regional Air Quality Management Plan 2009 – 2012 (Dublin City Council, 2009): "these levels subsequently reduced from being close to or exceeding legal limit values to a point that is almost one tenth of the legal standard of 250 μg/m^{3}."

As a result, air pollution from the burning of solid fuel can be of a greater concern in smaller towns in Ireland (Dublin City Council, 2009).

=== Air pollution nuisance defined ===
Section 4 of the Air Pollution Act, 1987 defines air pollution as:

a condition of the atmosphere in which a pollutant is present in such a quantity as to be liable to:

1. be injurious to public health
2. have a deleterious effect on flora or fauna or damage property, or
3. impair or interfere with amenities or the environment

The legislation applies in cases where there are emissions of smoke, particulate matter, fumes or where there are odours in areas specifically defined in the regulations.

=== Regulation of solid fuels ===
The Air Pollution Act (Marketing, Sale, Distribution and Burning of Specified Fuels) Regulations, 2012 (S.I. No. 326 of 2012), consolidated all previous applicable/associated regulations made under the Air Pollution Act, e.g. Air Pollution (Marketing, Sale and Distribution of Fuel) Regulations 1990. Under Section 6 it is an offence in these regulations for the home owner/occupier of any private dwelling to burn bituminous (smoky) coal. Not only that but is also an offence to market, sell or distribute any fuels specified in the regulations within defined areas of Ireland.

=== Penalties for non-compliance ===
The Air Pollution Act (Marketing, Sale, Distribution and Burning of Specified Fuels) Regulations, 2012 enable local authorities to take enforcement action against anyone suspected of non-compliance by initiating prosecutions at District Court level.

Section 20 of the Environment (Miscellaneous Provisions) Act, 2015 increased the enforcement options for local authorities by amending Section 12A of the Air Pollution Act, 1987 to enable the issuing of fixed penalty notices i.e. on the spot fines. Following the signing into law of the Air Pollution (Fixed Payment Notice) Regulations, 2015 in December 2015, by Minister Alan Kelly, local authorities now have the option of issuing fixed penalty notices for alleged breaches of the 2012 Regulations. (Limerick City Council, 2016)

Penalties range from a ceiling of €1000 (marketing, selling or distributing) for on the spot fines or up to €5000 plus costs if court proceedings are instigated.

=== Future direction ===
Because of the failure to meet the objectives of the World Health Organization (WHO), i.e. clean air is considered to be a basic requirement of human health and the fact that within the EU, "poor air quality is worse than for road traffic accidents, making it the number one environmental cause of premature death in the EU", in December 2013, the EU announced a Clean Air Policy Package (after a comprehensive review which began in 2011) to reduce the effect on human health. This package has at its core the following:

- A new Clean Air Programme for Europe enabling existing targets are met in a much shorter term with more detailed new air quality objectives for the period up to 2030. Support via research, innovation and probably most important of all, co-operation between all stakeholders will be a factor.
- The current National Emission Ceilings Directive will be revised thus ensuring a much more stringent approach to the six main pollutants named above,
- A proposal for a new Directive to reduce pollution from smaller power stations that have not been included heretofore, i.e. combustion plants up to 50 MWth

Given the fact that in Ireland, in 2012, approximately 1200 deaths were attributed to air pollution, it is still an issue that requires further measures.

According to the 2022 EEA report on air quality in Europe, "further efforts will be needed to meet the zero pollution vision for 2050 of reducing air pollution to levels no longer considered harmful to health." The current action plan has a target of 25 percent reduction in air pollution impacts on the environment by 2030. Additionally, the zero pollution action plan will focus on reducing health impacts by up to 55 percent in the same timeline.

== See also ==
- Environment of the European Union
