= Recycled fuel =

Recycled fuel is fuel made of residues as CO_{2} produced by using a primary fuel.

For example, CO_{2} pollution in the atmosphere, produced by petrol burning or other sources, can be extracted to produce fuel through an artificial photosynthesis based in nanotechnology, which helps to mitigate pollution, climate change and energy issues.
