= Diesel Emissions Reduction Act =

U.S. law

The Diesel Emissions Reduction Act (Pub.L. 111-364), or DERA (as it will be referred to for the remainder of this article), is a part of the Energy Policy Act of 2005 (Pub.L. 109-58). The law appropriated funds to federal and state loan programs to either rebuild diesel-powered vehicle engines to more stringent emission standards or install emission reduction systems, notify affected parties, and share the technological information with countries that have poor air quality standards.

== Provisions ==
=== National grant and loan programs ===
The Environmental Protection Agency (EPA) was charged with distributing DERA's funds. 70% of these available funds are to provide grants and low-cost revolving loans. These loans are issued on a competitive basis to maximize reductions in diesel emissions in terms of the number of tons of pollution and emissions exposure. DERA highlights that areas with a dense population of fleet vehicles and designated by the EPA as low air quality areas should receive priority for these funds.

DERA also stipulates that at least 50% of the funds available should be distributed to public vehicle fleets. Of the total appropriated funds, 90% must be used for projects that use existing certified engine technology, or verified configuration, and that 10% should be used for developing and commercializing new technologies. Test plans for new technologies should be submitted to the EPA or California Air Resources Board (CARB).

The funds cover retrofit engine technology for buses, medium-duty trucks, heavy-duty trucks, marine engines, locomotives, off-road engines or construction vehicles, cargo handlers, agricultural equipment, mining equipment, and energy production equipment. The funds are appropriated only for voluntary reduction of emissions and cannot be used to meet the requirements of any federal, state, or local laws for emissions standards. Additionally, states cannot themselves mandate the elective emissions reductions.

=== State grant and loan programs ===
In addition to national loan programs, DERA made 30% of federally appropriated funds available to support state grant and loan programs that are designed to curb diesel emissions. These funds are designed to help the states meet diesel emissions reductions through the use of certified engine configurations or verified technologies only. This does not cover research and development of new technologies as in the federal grant program. States can apply for this aid through the EPA, which reviews the application and decides if a state is eligible for a monetary allocation. If all 50 states qualify for funding, each state receives 2% of the appropriated funds for the state grant and loan program. However, if all 50 states do not qualify, each qualifying state receives 2% plus a share that is population-dependent for that state. A state that matches the funds appropriated by DERA receives an incentive payment equal to 50% of the funds allocated by the state.

=== Evaluation and report ===
DERA required the EPA to submit to Congress a report regarding the implementation of the federal and state grant and loan programs a year after funds were appropriated. The EPA released this report in August 2009, reporting its success in reducing 46,000 tons of nitrogen oxide emissions and 2,200 tons of fine particulate matter. This was reported as a public health benefit between $580 million and $1.4 billion and saved operators 3.2 million US gallons (12,000 m^{3}) of fuel in 2008 (a cost savings of $8 million). The report stated that upwards of 14,000 diesel-powered engines were made cleaner under DERA, two-thirds of those being trucks and school buses through EPA sector outreach programs.

=== Outreach and incentives ===
The effect of DERA required that the EPA inform entities that are eligible or potentially eligible for federal and state programs. The resultant movement was the National Clean Diesel Campaign (NCDC). DERA also requires that the EPA share the technological resources regarding the retrofitting and modification of diesel engines to reduce emissions with foreign countries that have poor air quality standards.

=== Interaction with other laws ===
DERA clearly stipulates that any provisions made does not supersede any authority of the Clean Air Act (42 U.S.C. 7401–7626) on or before DERA's effective date.

== Legislative history ==
The Diesel Emissions Reduction Act of 2010 was first introduced as the 5809 bill seen by the 111th House of Representatives. It was introduced in the House of Representatives on January 21, 2010. It passed the House on September 22, 2010, and then moved on to the Senate. However, the Senate already had a bill in progress that did basically the same thing that H.R. 5809 did. That bill was the Voinovich-Carper Diesel Emissions Reduction Act of 2010, which was the 3973 bill heard by the 111th Senate. S.3973 was first introduced to the Senate on November 18, 2010, but never made it past the Senate floor. Possibly because The Diesel Emissions Reduction Act of 2010 (H.R. 5809) was already making its way in the Senate. Ultimately the DERA that passed and became law was the one that was introduced by the House.

=== National Clean Diesel Campaign ===
The National Clean Diesel Campaign focuses on the health of Americans due to the exhaust emissions from diesel engines; specifically nitrogen oxides and particulate matter. It includes regulations for new diesel engines, voluntary programs for the existing diesel fleet, diesel emission reduction technologies and strategies, and current collaboratives and partnerships.

=== Differences in provisions of original bill and law in 2005 ===
In July 2005, Wayne Nastri, Regional Administrator for Region 9 of the EPA, initially proposed the idea of a Diesel Emissions Reduction in the 109th Congress, 1st session. Nastri focuses on the negative health effects that diesel has on the environment. He concludes that diesel fuel, when burned, emits both nitrogen oxides and particulate matters. Nitrogen oxides contribute to smog, while the particle matter contributes to illness in humans. Nastri even states that diesel exhaust is a likely carcinogen. Nastri concludes his address by stating that even through the current efforts of the Clean Diesel Emissions Campaign, it will take a staggering amount of money that the EPA does not have. He acknowledges this however, and states he looks forward to working with the members of the Subcommittee on Clean Air, Climate Change & Nuclear Safety of the Committee on Environment & Public Works to reduce the health effects of diesel exhaust.

=== Differences in provisions of DERA 2005 and DERA 2010 ===
Under this renewal, DERA would be active until 2016, and the legislation would attempt to modify the program by adding a competitive bidding process for groups seeking funding. This bill would eligibility requirements for grants and low-cost loans to include individual owners and other private entities that manage diesel fleets and are contractors with the federal government. It would also require 95% of funds appropriated to be expanded in a given year on grants to eligible program participants. The bill would not authorize $100 million annually from fiscal year 2012 through 2016.

== Support ==
The Emissions Control Technology Association (ECTA), a coalition of a few hundred organizations that range from state and local government entities, to non-profit organizations and even private businesses and corporations, was one of the largest supporters of ECTA. On September 17, 2010, ECTA wrote a letter on behalf of its member organizations thanking Senators George Voinovich (R) and Tom Carper (D – Delaware) for their bipartisan efforts in helping pass the 2010 renewal of DERA. This was a success for ECTA, whose mission is to achieve higher air quality through public policy that curbs harmful emissions. In the letter, ECTA states that more than $20 in healthcare savings is generated for every dollar spent on DERA, yielding a high cost-benefit ratio.

== Implementation ==
On January 5, 2017, the EPA announced that it was awarding more than $7.7 million to replace or retrofit 401 older diesel school buses from 88 school bus fleets in 27 states. Since 2008, the program has funded over 700 clean diesel projects across the country, reducing emissions in more than 70,000 engines.

== See also ==
- Energy Policy Act of 2005
- United States Environmental Protection Agency

== External resources ==
- National Clean Diesel Campaign (NCDC)
- Emissions Control Technology Association (ECTA)
