= Bitumen-based fuel =

Fuel for industrial use

Bitumen-based fuel is fuel specifically developed for industrial use. Raw bitumen, processed from Bituminous rocks, has an extremely high viscosity.

== Properties ==
Bitumen has an extremely high viscosity, between 8 and 10 API degrees (at ambient temperatures), rendering it unusable for use in electric power stations. Bitumen can be modified by mixing it with fresh water and a small amount of phenol-based surfactant. The resulting mixture has properties similar to conventional fuel oil.

A newer version of bitumen-based fuel has replaced the original version with an alcohol-based surfactant, making it easier to transport the fuel and eliminating the health concerns associated with the phenol group of surfactants.

== Industrial exploitation ==
The most well known bitumen-based fuel has been developed by Intevep, the Research and Development Affiliate of Petroleos de Venezuela SA (PDVSA), in a collaboration with BP, and is branded "Orimulsion." It is an emulsion of natural bitumen mined from the Orinoco Belt and fresh water.

Bitumen-based fuel is currently used as a commercial boiler fuel in power plants in Canada, Japan, Lithuania, and China. Commonly available air pollutant control technology can limit emissions from Orimulsion to levels considered Best Available Control Technology, as defined by the United States Environmental Protection Agency.

== See also ==
- Bituminous coal
