= Super seeder =

A super seeder is towed behind a tractor, that sows (plants) especially wheat seeds in rows directly without any prior seedbed preparation. It is operated with the PTO of the tractor and is connected to it with three-point linkage. The Super Seeder is an advanced agricultural machine than Happy seeder, engineered to revolutionize traditional farming methods. It offers an efficient, time-saving solution, allowing farmers to sow wheat seeds directly after rice harvest without the need for prior stubble burning, thereby contributing significantly to environmental preservation. It is mostly used to sow wheat seeds after the paddy harvest in North Indian states.

== Importance in stubble burning management ==
Traditional wheat farming involves a series of steps such as clearing the harvested paddy fields by burning the leftover stubble, tilling the soil, and then sowing the seeds. This process is not only time-consuming and labor-intensive but also environmentally harmful. Stubble burning contributes to air pollution, exacerbating climate change effects and posing health risks to local communities. The Super Seeder eliminates these adverse effects by providing an integrated solution for planting wheat seeds. This machine cuts and uproots the paddy straw, sows the wheat seeds, and deposits the straw over the sown area as mulch in a single pass. Various Workshops are also organised by state agricultural universities for awareness regarding Importance of super seeder in Stubble Burning Management.
