= Badarpur Thermal Power Station =

Power station in Delhi, India

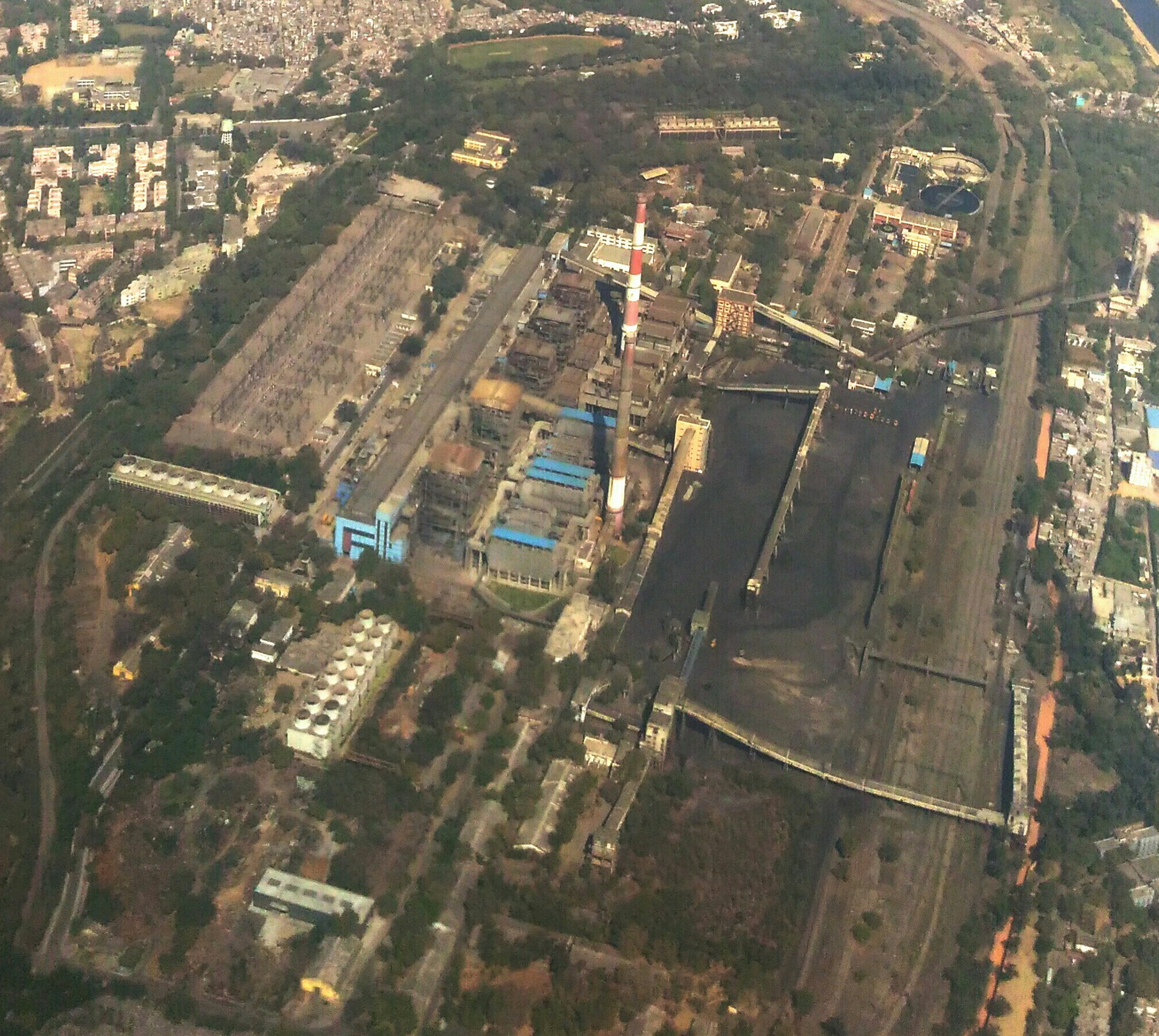
- Aerial view of Badarpur Thermal Power Station
- Country: India
- Location: Mathura Road, Badarpur, Delhi
- Coordinates: 28°30′20″N 77°18′25″E
- Status: Permanently Closed
- Commission date: 1973
- Decommission date: 15 October 2018
- Operator: NTPC

Thermal power station
- Primary fuel: Coal

Power generation
- Units operational: 5
- Nameplate capacity: 705 MW

External links
- Website: www.ntpc.co.in

Badarpur Thermal Power Station was a Power Station located at Badarpur area in NCT Delhi. The power plant was one of the coal based power plants of NTPC. The National Power Training Institute (NPTI) for North India Region under Ministry of Power, Government of India was established at Badarpur in 1974, within the Badarpur Thermal power plant (BTPS) complex. The power plant permanently shut down on 15 October 2018.

== Power plant ==
The Badarpur Thermal Power Station has an installed capacity of 705 MW. It was situated in the south-eastern Edge of Delhi on Mathura Road, New Delhi. It was the first central sector power plant conceived in India, in 1965. It was originally conceived to provide power to neighbouring states of Haryana, Punjab, Jammu and Kashmir, U.P., Rajasthan, and Delhi. But since the year 1987 Delhi has become its sole beneficiary. It was owned and conceived by Central Electric Authority. Its construction was started in the year 1968, and the First unit was commissioned on 26 July 1973. The coal for the plant was derived from the Jharia Coal Fields. This was constructed under ownership of Central Electric Authority, later it was transferred to NTPC.

It supplies power to Delhi city. It was one of the oldest plants in operation. Its 100 MW units capacity has been reduced to 95 MW. These units have an indirectly fired boiler, while 210 MW units have a directly fired boiler. All the turbines are of Russian design. Both turbine and boilers have been supplied by BHEL. The boiler of the Stage-I units is of Czech design. The boilers of units 4 and 5 are designed by Combustion Engineering (USA). The instrumentation of the stage I units and unit 4 are of Russian design. The instrumentation of unit 5 was provided by M/S Instrumentation Ltd. Kota, and was of Kent design.

In 1978 the management of the plant was transferred to NTPC, from CEA. The performance of the plant increased significantly, and steadily after the take over by NTPC until 2006, but now the plant is facing various issues.

Being an old plant, Badarpur Thermal Power Station (BTPS) has little automation. Its performance was deteriorating due to various reasons, like ageing, poor quantity and quality of cooling water etc. It receives cooling water from the Agra Canal, which was an irrigation canal from Yamuna River. Due to rising water pollution, the water of Yamuna is highly polluted. This polluted water then goes into a condenser, adversely affect the life of condenser tubes, resulting in frequent tube leakages. This dirty water from tube leakages gets mixed into the feedwater cycle causes numerous problems, like frequent boiler tube leakages, and silica deposition on turbine blades.

Apart from poor quality, the quantity of water supply was also erratic due to lack of co-ordination between NTPC and UP irrigation which manages the Agra Canal.

The quality of the coal supplied has degraded considerably. At worst times, there were many unit tripping owing to poor quality. The poor coal quality also put burdens on equipment, like mills and their performance also goes down. The coal for the plant was fetched from far away, that makes the total fuel cost double of coal cost at a coal mine. This factor, coupled with low efficiency due to ageing and old design makes electricity of the plant costlier.

Presently the management was headed by Mr Chandan Chakraborthy, General manager.

The cost of power from Badarpur was Rs 4.62/kWh making it one of the most costly in India.

== Environmental Effects ==
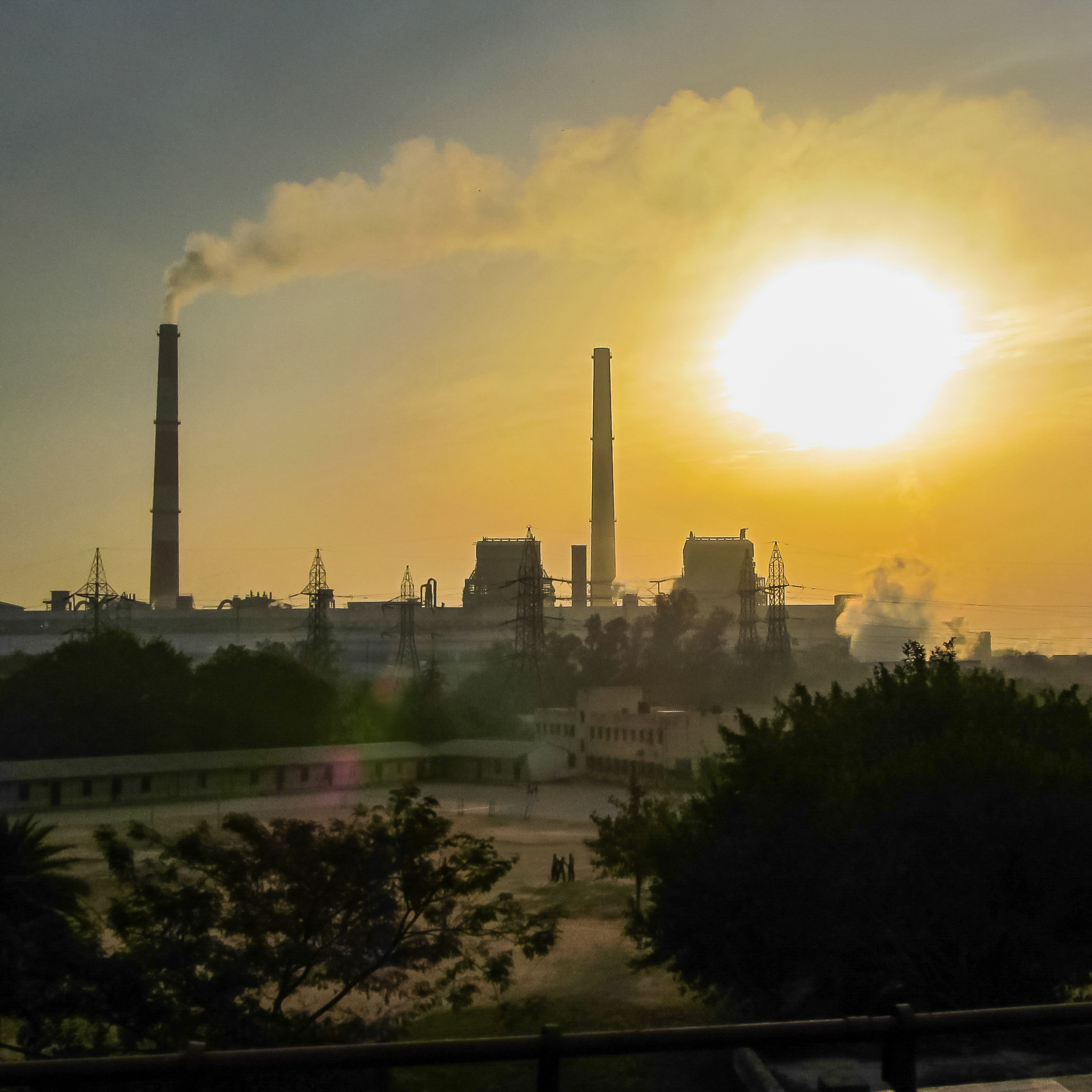
Pollution from the plant in 2012

According to a 2015 study by the Centre for Science and Environment, The Badarpur Power Plant was the most polluting power plant in India. The plant contributed only 8% of the Delhi's electric power but produced 30%-40% of the city's particulate matter pollution from the energy sector.

During the Great smog of Delhi, the power plant was shut down to alleviate the acute air pollution suffered by residents of the city. It was restarted on 16 March 2017. Environment Pollution Prevention and Control Authority (EPCA) has proposed to close down the plant by July 2018. The shutdown date was delayed until October due to delays in the construction of a necessary substation and was shut down permanently on 15 October 2018.

== Installed capacity ==
The Badarpur Thermal Power Station has an installed capacity of 705 MW.

Stage	Unit Number	Installed Capacity (MW)	Date of Commissioning	Status
First	1	95	July, 1973	Stalled
First	2	95	August, 1974	Stalled
First	3	95	March, 1975	Stalled
Second	4	210	December, 1978	Stalled
Second	5	210	December, 1981	Stalled
