= Air pollution in Delhi =

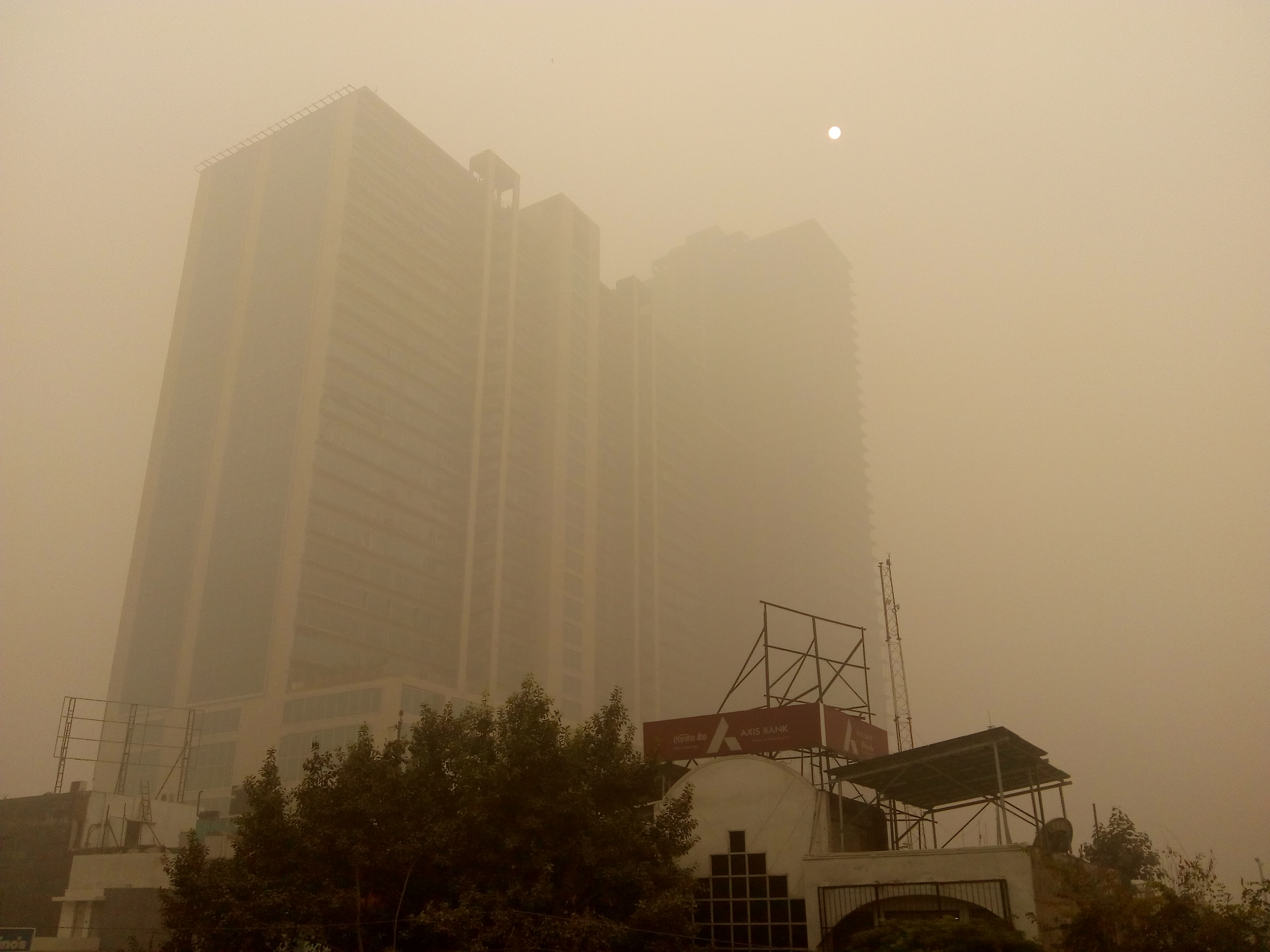
A dense toxic smog in New Delhi blocks out the sun, Nov. 8, 2017.

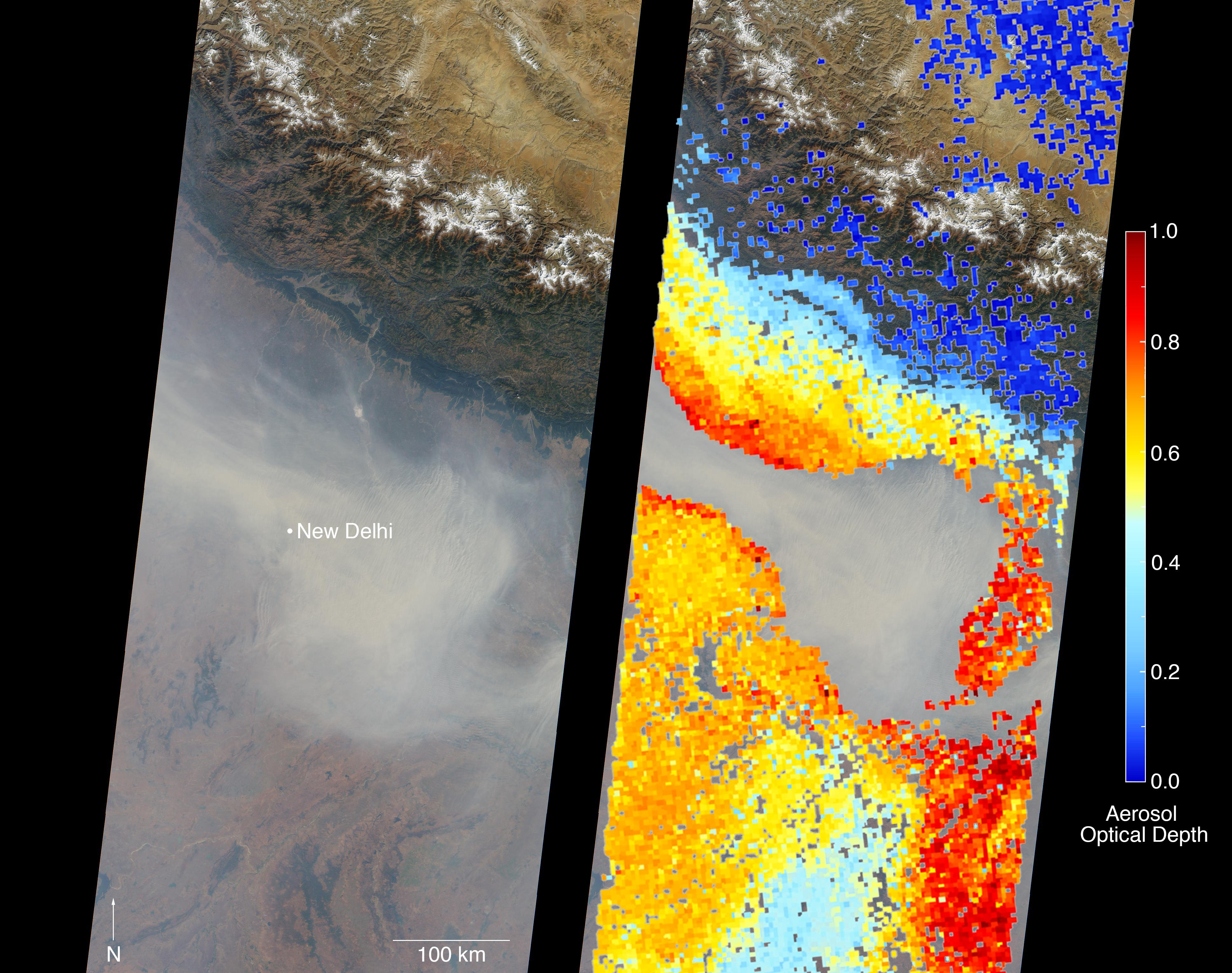
MISR measurement, Nov. 5, 2016: The optical depth of the thick haze was too much for calculation, "because the haze is so thick that the algorithm has classified the area as cloud". (Less than 37% of sunlight, AQI = 751).

Air pollution in Delhi, in the National Capital Region, India, was found to be one of the most lethal of any city in the world in an August 2022 study of 7,000 world cities by the US-based Health Effects Institute. Air pollution in India is estimated to kill about 2 million people every year. India has the world's highest death rate from chronic respiratory diseases and asthma according to the World Health Organization. In Delhi, poor air quality has irreversibly damaged the lungs of 2.2 million children.

During the COVID-19 pandemic lockdown in India, the air quality in Delhi significantly improved.

India's Ministry of Earth Sciences published a research paper in October 2018 attributing almost 41% of air pollution to vehicular emissions, 21.5% to dust and 18% to industrial emissions. The director of the Centre for Science and Environment alleged that the Society of Indian Automobile Manufacturers was lobbying "against the report" because it was "inconvenient" to the automobile industry.

The air quality index (AQI) in Delhi generally falls within the Satisfactory (51–100) and Moderate (101–200) ranges between March and September, and then drastically deteriorates to Poor (201–300), Severe (301–400), or Hazardous (401–500+) levels between October and February due to various factors including the burning of effigies during Vijayadashami, the bursting of firecrackers during Diwali, thermal power plants in the National Capital Region, stubble burning, road dust, vehicle pollution and cold weather.

In November 2016, in an event known as the "Great Smog of Delhi", the air pollution spiked far beyond acceptable levels. The levels of PM2.5 and PM 10 particulate matter hit 999 micrograms per cubic meter, well above their respective 24-hour peak limits of 15 and 60 micrograms per cubic metre.

According to Bloomberg, 1,670,000 people died due to polluted air in India in 2019. According to data released by the Ministry of Environment, Forest and Climate Change in 2022, the Air Quality Index in Delhi stood at over 200 for at least half the year.

Animal agriculture also contributes to Delhi's pollution problem, as smog and other harmful particles have been produced by farmers burning their crops in other states since the 1980s.

An initiative that is being considered to address air pollution is a 1,600 km long and 5 km wide green ecological corridor along the Aravalli Range from Gujarat to Delhi connecting to the Sivalik Hills range. This would involve the planting of 1.35 billion (135 crore) new native trees over 10 years to combat pollution. In December 2019, IIT Bombay, in partnership with the McKelvey School of Engineering of Washington University in St. Louis, launched the Aerosol and Air Quality Research Facility to study air pollution in India.

The Delhi government announced in November 2021 that it would be shutting all schools and government offices for a week due to the severe air pollution. The government told the Supreme Court that it was confident and prepared for a complete lockdown. The Supreme Court asked authorities in the NCR region to consider remote work policies for employees. When the air quality in Delhi on 18 November 2021 slipped into the "severe" category with an AQI of 362, the Supreme Court of India reprimanded the central and state governments and asked them to take strict measures to reduce pollution in Delhi and the NCR region.

In November 2023, New Delhi was suffering from particularly high levels of air pollution. 38% of this 2023's pollution has been caused by stubble burning.

On November 18, 2024, Delhi recorded its worst air quality of the season, with a 24-hour AQI reading of 491, classified as "severe plus." This level, as reported by India's pollution control authority, indicates hazardous conditions with significant health impacts, particularly for vulnerable populations. The reading marks the highest AQI level for Delhi in 2024. The Bharatiya Janta Party-led Delhi Government was accused of deliberately distorting AQI data after Municipal Corporation of Delhi tankers (controlled by the BJP) were witnessed spraying water around air-quality monitoring stations in a bid to suppress actual readings that suggested catastrophic air quality.

== Particulate matter levels in Delhi ==
Air quality or ambient/outdoor air pollution is represented by the annual mean concentration of particulate matter PM_{10} (particles smaller than 10 microns) and PM_{2.5} (particles smaller than 2.5 microns, about 25 to 100 times thinner than a human hair).

PM_{10} levels, for the period 2008 and 2013, based on data of 1600 cities in 91 countries, range from 26 to 208 micrograms per cubic meter of air (μg/m^{3}), with the world average being 71 μg/m^{3}. 13 of the 25 cities worldwide with the highest levels of PM are in India.

The 2022 version of the WHO ambient air quality database status report includes annual means for PM_{10}, PM_{2.5}, and NO_{2} for the years between 2010 and 2019, and it covers 6,743 human settlements in 117 countries worldwide. It documents the following annual mean concentration on particulate matter from 2010 to 2020 in Delhi:

| Year | PM_{2.5} (μg/m3) | PM_{10} (μg/m3) | NO_{2} (μg/m3) |
|---|---|---|---|
| 2010 | 153 | 274 | |
| 2011 | 237 | 270 | |
| 2012 | 119 | 238 | |
| 2013 | 120 | 226 | 69 |
| 2014 | 198 | 216 | 66 |
| 2015 | 113 | 214 | |
| 2016 | 149 | 292 | 69 |
| 2017 | 129 | 213 | |
| 2018 | 106 | | |
| 2019 | 105 | 192 | |
| 2020 | 114 | 194 | 61 |

In 2010, the year of the WHO survey, the average PM_{10} level in Delhi was 286 μg/m^{3}. In 2013, the PM_{2.5} level was 153 μg/m^{3}. These levels are considered very unhealthy. In Gwalior, the city with the worst air quality in India, the PM_{10} and PM_{2.5} levels were 329 μg/m^{3} and 144 μg/m^{3} respectively. For comparison, the PM_{10} and PM_{2.5} levels in London were 22 μg/m^{3} and 16 μg/m^{3} respectively.

In December–January 2015, in Delhi, an average PM_{2.5} level of 226 μg/m^{3} was noted by US embassy monitors in Delhi. The average in Beijing for the same period was 95. Delhi's air is twice as bad as Beijing's air. As of November 2017, experts in several monitoring stations have reportedly measured an air quality index of 999. This is said to be the equivalent of smoking 45 to 50 cigarettes a day. This has led to the chief minister of Delhi comparing the nation's capital (National Capital Territory) to a "gas chamber".

According to the WHO ambient air quality database, 2022 status report update, recommended levels as of 2021 are 15 μg/m^{3} (annual mean) for PM_{10}, 5 μg/m^{3} (annual mean) for PM_{2.5}, and 10 μg/m^{3} (annual mean) for NO_{2}. These guidelines have changed from those of 2005 which were 20 μg/m^{3} (annual mean) for PM_{10}, 10 μg/m^{3} (annual mean) for PM_{2.5}, and 40 μg/m^{3} (annual mean) for NO_{2}.

== Causes of poor air quality ==
- Motor vehicle emissions are one of the causes of poor air quality. Other causes include wood-burning fires, cow dung cake combustion, fires on agricultural land, exhaust from diesel generators, dust from construction sites, burning garbage and illegal industrial activities in Delhi. Although pollution is at its worst from November to February, Delhi's air misses clean-air standards by a wide margin for much of the year. On the worst days, the air quality index, a benchmark ranging from zero (good) to 500 (hazardous), exceeds 400.
- Thermal power plants in NCR.
- Agricultural stubble burning in Haryana and Punjab, coupled with north-westerly winds also affects Delhi's air quality since the 1980s when crops are being harvested. This is the biggest cause of air pollution in Delhi and as can be seen from air pollution index data, the air quality drastically deteriorated in October, the season of crop burning in Punjab and Haryana. During the crop-burning season, the practice can account for up to 45% of Delhi's pollution, according to government meteorologists.
- The drift/mist emissions from the wet cooling towers are also a source of particulate matter as they are widely used in industry and other sectors for dissipating heat in cooling systems.
- Although Delhi is kerosene free and 90% of the households use LPG for cooking, the remaining 10% uses wood, crop residue, cow dung, and coal for cooking. (Census-India, 2011)
- Fire in Bhalswa landfill is also a major reason for airborne particles in Delhi.

A study in 2016 measured the sources and average levels of various types of air pollution in Delhi. Of PM_{2.5} pollution, 38% came from road dust, 20% from vehicles, 12% from domestic fuel burning, and 11% from industrial point sources. Of PM_{10} pollution, 56% came from road dust, 10% from concrete batching, 10% from industrial point sources, and 9% from vehicles. Of NO_{x} emissions, 52% came from industrial point sources (mostly from power plants and 36% from vehicles (but the 36% was potentially more damaging due to being emitted close to people). Of SO_{2} emissions, 90% came from industrial point sources. Of CO emissions, 83% came from vehicles. The large contributions of vehicles and road dust to air pollution have been made worse by court-ordered restrictions on bus service in Delhi, which had the effect of accelerating the purchase of private cars and the construction of roads to accommodate them.

A collaborative study between IIT Delhi and IIT Kanpur concluded that biomass burning drive is the primary cause air pollution in Delhi following the days after Vijayadashami and Diwali. It also said that stubble burning and increased heating requirements of the region in winters increase the biomass burning activity.

=== Past causes ===
- The Badarpur Thermal Power Station, a coal-fired power plant built in 1973, was another major source of air pollution in Delhi. Despite producing less than 8% of the city's electric power, it produced 80 to 90% of the particulate matter pollution from the electric power sector in Delhi. During the Great Smog of Delhi in November 2016, the Badarpur Power Plant was temporarily shut down to alleviate the acute air pollution but was allowed to restart on 1 February 2017. In view of the detrimental effect to the environment, the power plant has been permanently shut down since 15 October 2018.

== Air quality index data of Delhi by month ==
| Month | January | February | March | April | May | June | July | August | September | October | November | December |
|---|---|---|---|---|---|---|---|---|---|---|---|---|
| Average air quality index | 301–400 (Severe) | 201–300 (Poor) | 101–200 (Moderate) | 101–200 (Moderate) | 101–200 (Moderate) | 101–200 (Moderate) | 51–100 (Satisfactory) | 51–100 (Satisfactory) | 51–100 (Satisfactory) | 201–300 (Poor) | 401–500 (Hazardous) | 401–500 (Hazardous) |

== Effects of poor air quality ==
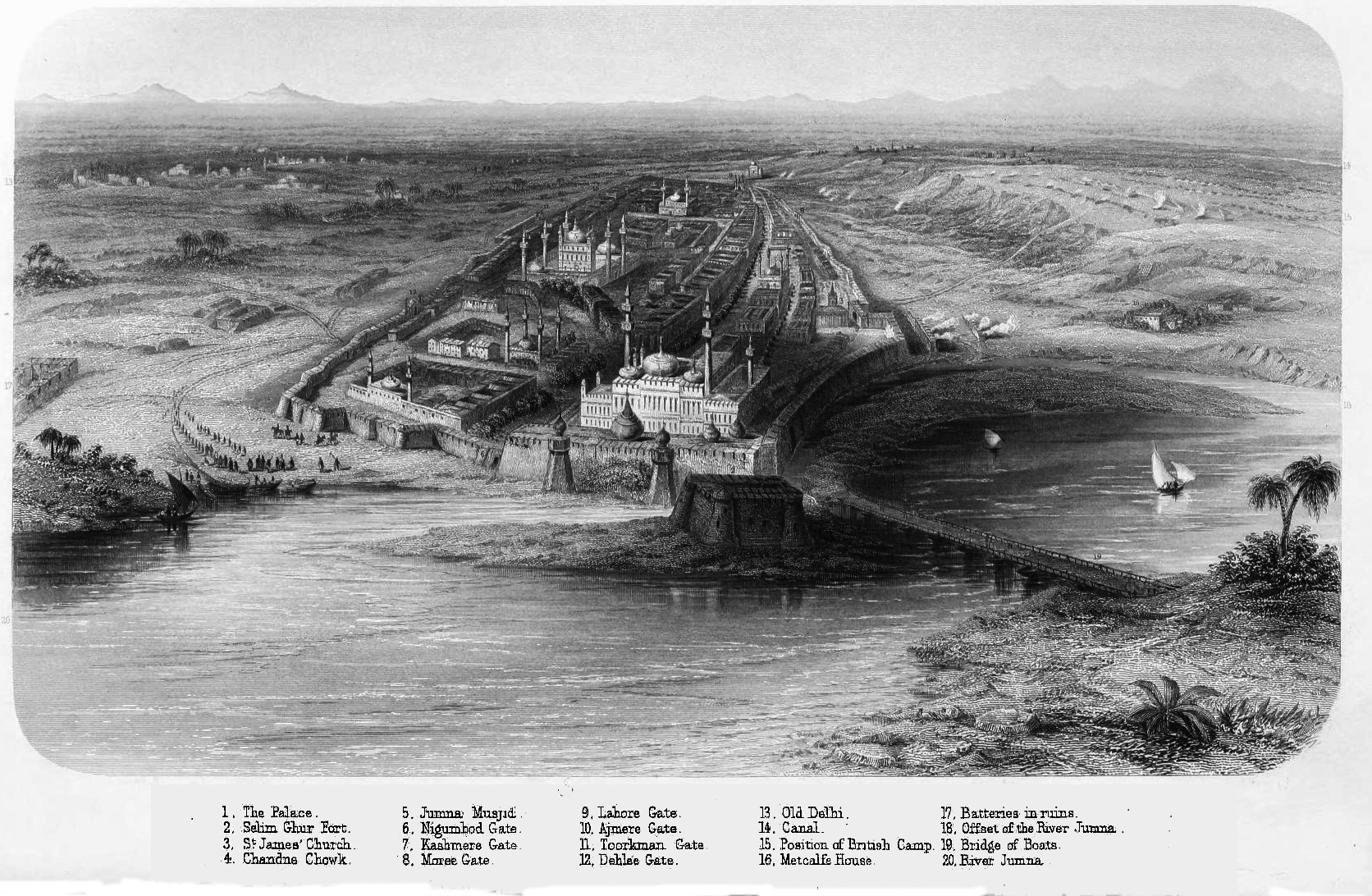
A view from Old Delhi (year 1857) to mountains of the Himalaya range

=== Effects on children ===
22 lakh (2,200,000) children in Delhi have irreversible lung damage due to poor air quality. In addition, research shows that pollution can lower children's immune system and increase the risks of cancer, epilepsy, diabetes and even adult-onset diseases like multiple sclerosis. Children are more vulnerable to the negative effects of air pollution as they are growing and developing due to breathing a higher rate of air per kilogram of their body weight. They also spend more time outside and are thus more exposed to it.

=== Effects on adults ===
Poor air quality is a cause of reduced lung capacity, headaches, sore throats, coughs, fatigue, lung cancer, and early death.

=== Control measures ===
In 2016, the Chief Minister of Delhi proposed these measures to reduce air pollution but didn't get any success due to the lack of implementation in reality. The efficacy of any individual step has been a matter of public debate.

- All Delhi schools will remain shut for the next few days.
- For the next five days, no construction and demolition work will take place in Delhi.
- All diesel generator sets have been banned for the next ten days, except at hospitals and in emergencies.
- The Delhi government will supply power to unauthorized colonies which use diesel generators.
- The coal-based Badarpur power plant will be shut down for ten days. There will be no-fly ash transportation from the power plant.
- The Environment Department will launch an app to monitor the burning of leaves.
- Vacuum cleaning of roads will start on 10 November.
- Water sprinkling will start on all roads from the following days.
- People should stay at home as much as they can and they should try working from home.
- As per Faster Adoption and Manufacturing of Electric Vehicles in India scheme it is expected by 2030 all vehicles will be Battery electric and Hybrid
- All combustion engined vehicles will be upgraded to BS6 emission standards
- Any vehicle older than 10–15 years or below BS6 emissions will be banned
- Smog towers will be installed in the city to purify and clean the air
- The Pusa Bio-decomposer will help farmers harvest crops to prevent stubble burning.
- By 2021, the entire Delhi Metro is expected to be 100% powered by solar energy
- In 2022, the Punjab Government announced they will purchase maize, sorghum, pearl millet, sunflower and mung bean crops at MSP, encouraging farmers to adopt less water consuming options as a sustainable alternative to paddy and wheat in the wake of fast-depleting groundwater.

In October 2020, Delhi authorities established a 10-member air pollution control team working in a dedicated conference room. They examine complaints received through the "Green Delhi" mobile app. As of 2020, they also regulate construction dust and ban diesel generators. Air pollution is an issue of special concern during the COVID-19 pandemic because the virus can damage people's lungs and make them less able to cope with pollution.

=== Longer term measures ===
On 25 November 2017, the Supreme Court of India banned the sale of firecrackers in Delhi to alleviate pollution.

In another measure, the extremely polluting Badarpur power plant was permanently shut down on 15 October 2018. In October, 2020 the union environment ministry formed a commission for Air Quality Management in the National capital region and Adjoining Area Ordinance.

In 2023, the Supreme Court advised the Punjab Government to reconsider the Punjab Preservation of Subsoil Water Act, 2009, a state law aimed at conserving groundwater. The law prohibits sowing of paddy seeds before 10 May every year and transplantation before 10 June. It allows the crop to be sown only during the monsoon months and as a result encourages stubble burning due to restricted cultivation period.

== Great Smog of 2016–2017 ==
Great Smog of 2016–2017
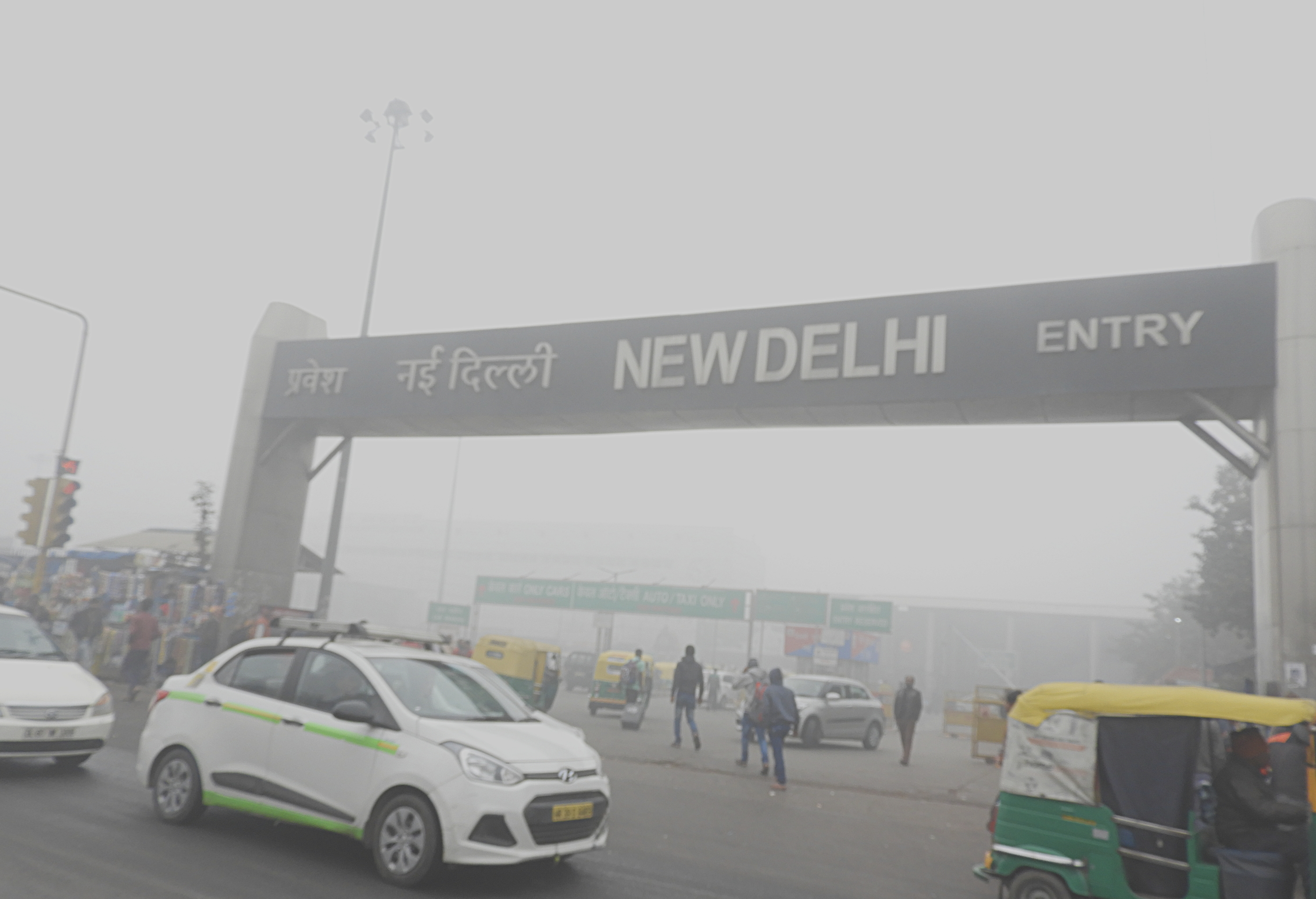
- Low visibility due to Smog at New Delhi railway station 31 December 2017. Railway building is not visible.
- Location: Delhi, India

The Great Smog of Delhi was a severe air-pollution event in New Delhi and adjoining areas in the National Capital Territory of India. Air pollution in 2016 peaked on both PM_{2.5} and PM_{10} levels. It was reported as one of the worst levels of air quality in Delhi since 1980.

Low visibility resulted in accidents across the city, notably a 24-vehicle pile-up on the Yamuna Expressway.

"The Great Smog" also led to cancellation and delay of public transport, primarily trains and flights.

Source of pollution

Majority of analysis sources are hinted towards colder weather, stagnant winds trapping the various sources of smoke. The primary sources of smoke are power plants, stubble burning, lit garbage, road dust, factories, and vehicles.

On 7 November 2016 the PM_{2.5} levels in Delhi shot up to a high of 999, much above the recommended 60 micrograms. At the same time, PM_{10} also shot up to 999 (the maximum level for the monitors), instead of the recommended limit of 100.

Again, on 8 November 2016 the PM_{2.5} levels shot up to 449. At the same time PM_{10} levels shot up to 663.

The temperature in New Delhi during this period was from 15 to 29 °C (59 to 84 °F).

According to a real-time source apportionment study conducted by the Delhi Pollution Control Committee (DPCC) in 2023, the burning of local organic waste—which includes wood, cow dung cakes, and agricultural or other waste burned for heating needs—contributes 24% to PM2.5 concentrations in Delhi during the winter season, when the demand for household heating rises. During this period, the impact of local sources such as the transport sector also increases, contributing approximately 23% to PM2.5 levels (TERI, 2019).

=== Incidents ===
During the second day of the third test of Sri Lankan cricket team in India in 2017-18 at Delhi, the smog forced Sri Lanka cricketers to stop playing and wear anti-pollution masks. Cricketer Lahiru Gamage reported to have shortness of breath. Nic Pothas, coach of Sri Lankan cricket team, reported that cricketer Suranga Lakmal had vomited regularly due to severe pollution effect on the Delhi ground. There was a halt of play from 12:32 pm to 12:49 pm which caused Indian coach Ravi Shastri to come out aggressively and have a talk with the field umpire David Boon.

=== State reaction ===
A Health Emergency was declared in the National Capital Territory by the Central Government of India to cope with the extrusive amount of polluted air. The day was declared as a holiday for schools, offices and other government centres.

Health effects

The government of Delhi has declared a health advisory for the following.

- Breathlessness
- Chest constriction
- Irritation in eyes
- Asthma
- Allergy

== Air quality monitoring stations ==
Days with healthy (= green) or unhealthy conditions with air pollution in year 2018. PM 2.5, air quality index.

The Indian Meteorological Department has air quality monitoring stations in Mathura Road, Delhi (Jor Bagh area), IGI Airport, IITM Delhi, Guru Teg Bahadur Hospital (Ghaziabad area), Dhirpur, Delhi Technological University, Pitampura, Shaheed Sukhdev College of Business Studies (Rohini), Aya Nagar (Gurgaon), and Noida. The air pollution monitor of the U.S. Embassy in New Delhi covers the area of Chanakyapuri.

== Response of expatriates and government ==
To contend with the poor air quality, embassies and international businesses in Delhi are considering reducing staff tenures, advising staff to reconsider bringing their children to Delhi, providing high-end air purifiers, and installing expensive air purifiers in their offices.

On 14 November 2021, the air quality index of Delhi reached 465 and in response to the severe air quality index, the Delhi government announced the closure of all educational institutions for a week from November 15 after the Supreme Court raised concerns over the deteriorating air quality index. On 17 November, as there was no improvement of the condition of the air quality index in Delhi. The Commission for Air Quality Monitoring (CAQM) directed that all schools, colleges and educational institutions will be closed until further notice, in Delhi and in NCR. Other than this the entry of trucks has been banned in Delhi; all construction activities have been halted until 21 November 2021 and 6 out of 11 thermal power plants in Delhi in a radius of 300 km have been shut down until 30 November, in an effort to reduce pollution and improve the air quality index.

The Delhi government said that to control the pollution in Delhi they will also be adding 1000 extra CNG buses to the fleet. The Civil Defense Unit will also be checking the registrations and pollution certificates of the cars randomly to curb the pollution. Diesel cars above 10 years and Petrol cars above 15 years of age are banned in Delhi due to the pollution they cause.

The Supreme Court of India also suggested that government officers living in government colonies should either commute by car pooling together or by public transport.

On 18 November, the Uttar Pradesh Pollution Control Board announced that schools will no longer be closed due to air pollution in Noida and Ghaziabad.

In view of pollution, the demand for air purifiers has increased significantly in Delhi-NCR. According to the available data, out of the total sales in the country, 70% of the demand is coming from Delhi-NCR. However, companies say that the demand for air purifiers has increased from other parts of the country as well.

The Delhi Government on 27 November 2021, banned the entry of commercial petrol and diesel vehicles in Delhi in view of the increasing pollution in Delhi. On 1 March 2025, the Delhi Government decided that fuel stations will stop providing fuel to vehicles older than 15 years starting 1 April 2025, in an effort to reduce vehicular air pollution.

In October 2025, Delhi Government was criticized for suppressing and tampering with data from air-quality monitoring stations during worst periods of air-pollution resulting from Diwali celebrations. Following this, cloud seeding was conducted over Delhi so that rains can settle pollutants and improve the air quality but the experiment yielded no significant results.

== Major incidents ==
In December 2017 during a test match between Sri Lankan and Indian cricket teams in New Delhi, Sri Lanka players began to feel breathing problems and several players vomited both in the restrooms and in the field and had to use face masks until the match was stopped. In the opinion of the Indian Medical Association president, the match should never have taken place and the ICC should have a policy on pollution.

In November 2024, pollution levels in Delhi reached drastic measures following increased fire activity in India and Pakistan's Punjab region as farmers burn off excess straw, caused a significant smog on the morning of 8 November, causing it to momentarily become the most polluted city in the world. Delhi again became the most polluted city in the world on 12 November, reaching an AQI reading of 1,200.

On 6 November 2026, the Supreme Court directed the governments of Delhi, Uttar Pradesh, Haryana and Rajasthan to file action plans within two weeks on vehicular emissions in the National Capital Region. A report by the Commission for Air Quality Management cited in the proceedings said vehicles were the largest single source of pollution in the region, accounting for about 23 per cent of pollution in winter and 19 per cent in summer. Independent satellite evaluations of agricultural stubble burning in northern India during the 2026 post-monsoon harvest season revealed notable differences with official government totals. Hiren Jethva, a scientist at NASA and Morgan State University, estimated that approximately 34,000 fires occurred throughout Punjab and Haryana beginning on 1 October, despite the Commission for Air Quality Management (CAQM) reporting 4,459 fires in Punjab through early November.

The difference was explained by farmers moving burning times to the late afternoon, which prevented polar-orbiting satellites like NOAA-20's VIIRS and Aqua's MODIS from using their customary overpass windows. To arrive at the revised estimate, Jethva calibrated geostationary INSAT-3DS thermal anomaly data and late-afternoon Aqua MODIS data.

On 13 November 2026, Delhi overtook Lahore to become the world's most polluted major city, with IQAir recording an air quality index of 334, rated hazardous, while the Central Pollution Control Board recorded a higher reading of 403, rated severe.

== Public reaction ==
On November 9, 2025, hundreds of people, including children and activists, protested at India Gate in New Delhi, against the dangerous levels of air pollution. The air quality index (AQI) was often above 300-400, making it a health emergency. Protesters called for immediate government action, criticizing years of neglecting the issue and manipulating pollution data. They blamed vehicle emissions, crop burning, and industrial waste for worsening pollution. Despite the peaceful nature of the protest, police detained about 80 people, though they were later released.

== See also ==
- Air pollution measurement
- Criteria air pollutants
- Environmental issues in Delhi
- List of most polluted cities by particulate matter concentration
- Tragedy of the commons
