= Happy seeder =

Type of agricultural machinery

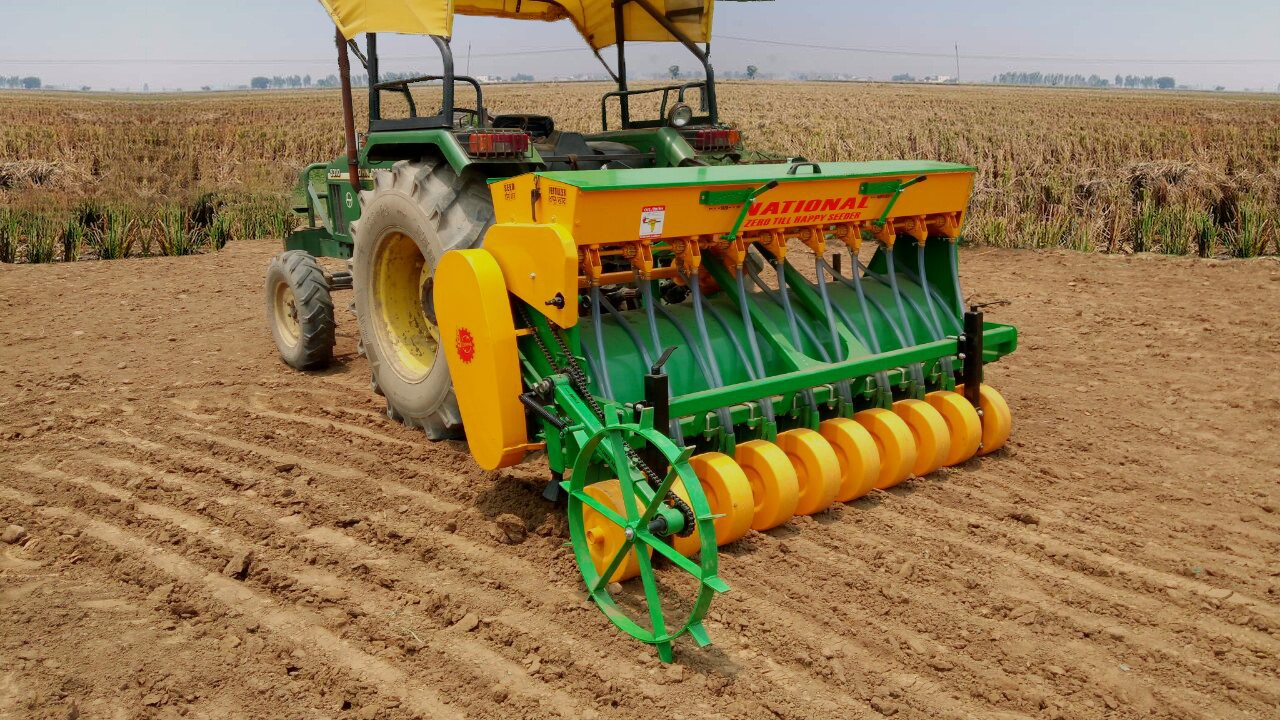
A National Agro Happy Seeder at work in the field after paddy harvest

A Happy Seeder is a no-till planter, towed behind a tractor, that sows (plants) seeds in rows directly without any prior seedbed preparation. It is operated with the PTO of the tractor and is connected to it with three-point linkage. It consists of a straw managing chopper and a zero till drill that makes it possible to sow new crop in the residue of the previous crop. Flail type straight blades are mounted on the straw management rotor that chops the stubbles that comes in contact with the sowing tine. It deposits the residue of the previous crop over the sown field as mulch. Mainly, it is used to sow wheat after the paddy harvest in North India.

== Background ==
Happy Seeder is a proposed solution for stubble management after harvesting of the paddy crops. It is similar to a Zero Till Ferti Seed Drill developed by National Agro Industries.

Usually, many farmers in Punjab and Haryana burn stubble, which has a severe socioeconomic and environmental impact on the North Indian regions. Paddy stubble burning results in large emissions of greenhouse gases such as carbon dioxide (CO_{2}), carbon monoxide (CO), nitrogen oxides (NO_{x}), and methane (CH_{4}) as well as particulate matter (PM_{10} and PM_{2.5}).

== Issues ==
1. Many farmers are reluctant to use Happy Seeder even when the government is offering up to 50% to 80% subsidy.
2. Some farmers complain that Happy Seeder is not an efficient machine to manage stubbles and leaves behind many particles, which are not ploughed back into the field. Thus, creating a problem in sowing and germination for the wheat crop.
3. For Happy Seeder to do its work efficiently, a SUPER SMS (Super Straw Management System) is needed while harvesting paddy, which cuts and spreads the residue evenly on the field.

== Benefits ==
1. Protects soil moisture by increasing filtration and reducing evaporation.
2. Regulates temperature, helping to control extremes of heat and radiation, and improves the soil's microclimate.
3. Preserves soil structure.
4. Does not interfere with natural drainage systems.
5. Controls soil erosion.
6. Increases soil fertility by slowing the decomposition of organic matter, thereby reducing carbon loss.
