= Stubble burning =

Agricultural practice

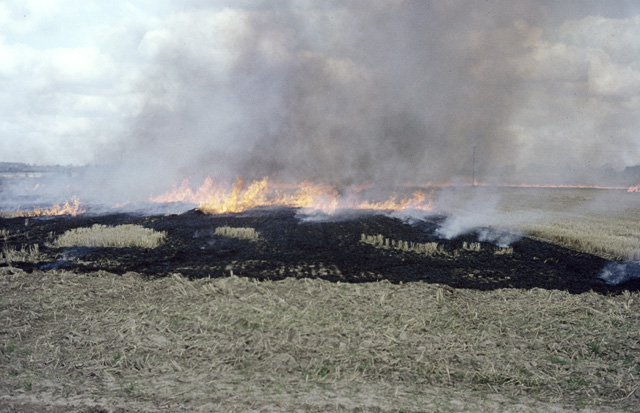
Stubble burning in Essex, England in 1986

Stubble burning is the practice of intentionally setting fire to the straw stubble that remains after grains, such as rice and wheat, have been harvested. The technique is used to quickly and cheaply clear fields. It is still widespread today.

Stubble burning has been associated with increasing air pollution over the past few decades due to the particulate matter contamination it distributes into the atmosphere. In India, stubble burning generates a thick haze. These fires pose a significant health risk to individuals across all ages.

In countries such as India and Pakistan, stubble burning is illegal. Enforcement is weak, allowing the practice to continue.

== Effects ==
This visualization shows fires detected in the United States from July 2002 through July 2011. Fires that reliably burn each year in western states and across the Southeast are likely to be deliberate.

The burning of stubble has both positive and negative consequences.

=== Generally helpful effects ===
- Cheaper and easier than other removal methods
- Helps to combat pests and weeds
- Biochar
- Reduced methane emission from biomass decay
- Can reduce nitrogen tie-up

=== Generally harmful effects ===
- Loss of nutrients.
- Pollution from smoke. Including greenhouse gases and others that damage the ozone layer.
- Damage to electrical and electronic equipment from floating threads of conductive waste.
- Risk of fires spreading out of control.
- Additionally, prolonged stubble burning kills beneficial microflora and fauna in soil which reduces organic matter and destroys the carbon-nitrogen equilibrium.

=== Health concerns related to stubble burning ===
A wide array of health disorders are associated with the stubble burning emission releases which have caused people to develop lung cancer and respiratory infections. The emissions also threaten the health of children who tend to have weaker organs. Not only that but the smog from the stubble burning also severely affects people with Chronic Obstructive Pulmonary Disorder as it worsens their health conditions. India also has the highest number of blind people in the world and if the smog gets in your eyes you are more likely to develop cataracts. Additionally, people who have been exposed to smog can develop eye irritation, eye-watering, and conjunctival hyperemia symptoms. In order to reduce pollution there needs to be severe attention to the issue involved with effective sustainable management practices enforced by the government. The Indian government has been receiving intense backlash for not reacting quickly enough to the health emergency, especially amongst the green revolution that is bringing attention to climate change concerns.

=== Alternative to stubble burning ===
The solutions to reduce the pollution from stubble burning involve mitigating crop farming, adhering to diversification of agriculture, adopting the paddy straw farming technique, and making biomass pellets.

Agriculture residues can have other uses, such as in particle board and biofuel, though these uses can still cause problems like erosion and nutrient loss.

Spraying an enzyme, which decomposes the stubble into useful fertiliser, improves the soil, avoids air pollution and prevents carbon dioxide emissions.

Several companies worldwide use leftover agricultural waste to make new products. Agricultural waste can serve as raw materials for new applications, such as paper and board, bio-based oils, leather, catering disposables, fuel and plastic. Another important way to manage the agricultural waste from stubble burning would be to detoxify the soil after it has been burned and using aerobic and anaerobic techniques that recycle organic matter.

=== Empowering farmers to use sustainable solutions ===
Another way to reduce particulate matter pollution entails the requirement of bringing severe attention to the issue in accordance with effective sustainable management practices and government support. Active stakeholder acknowledgment by the farm owners that are producing the products that are used in stubble burning will need to form agreements with the government too. Unfortunately, many of the farmers that contribute to the pollution are unaware of the implications of how harmful stubble burning is for the earth especially as to how it depletes soil of nutrients and contaminates the air. Empowering farmers and educating them about the harmful consequences that stubble burning causes to the atmosphere is also necessary for stubble burning pollution reduction.

Emerging mitigation frameworks propose utilizing localized edge-compute telemetry paired with behavioral economic micro-incentives to preemptively offset the financial friction of crop residue management.

== Attitudes toward stubble burning ==
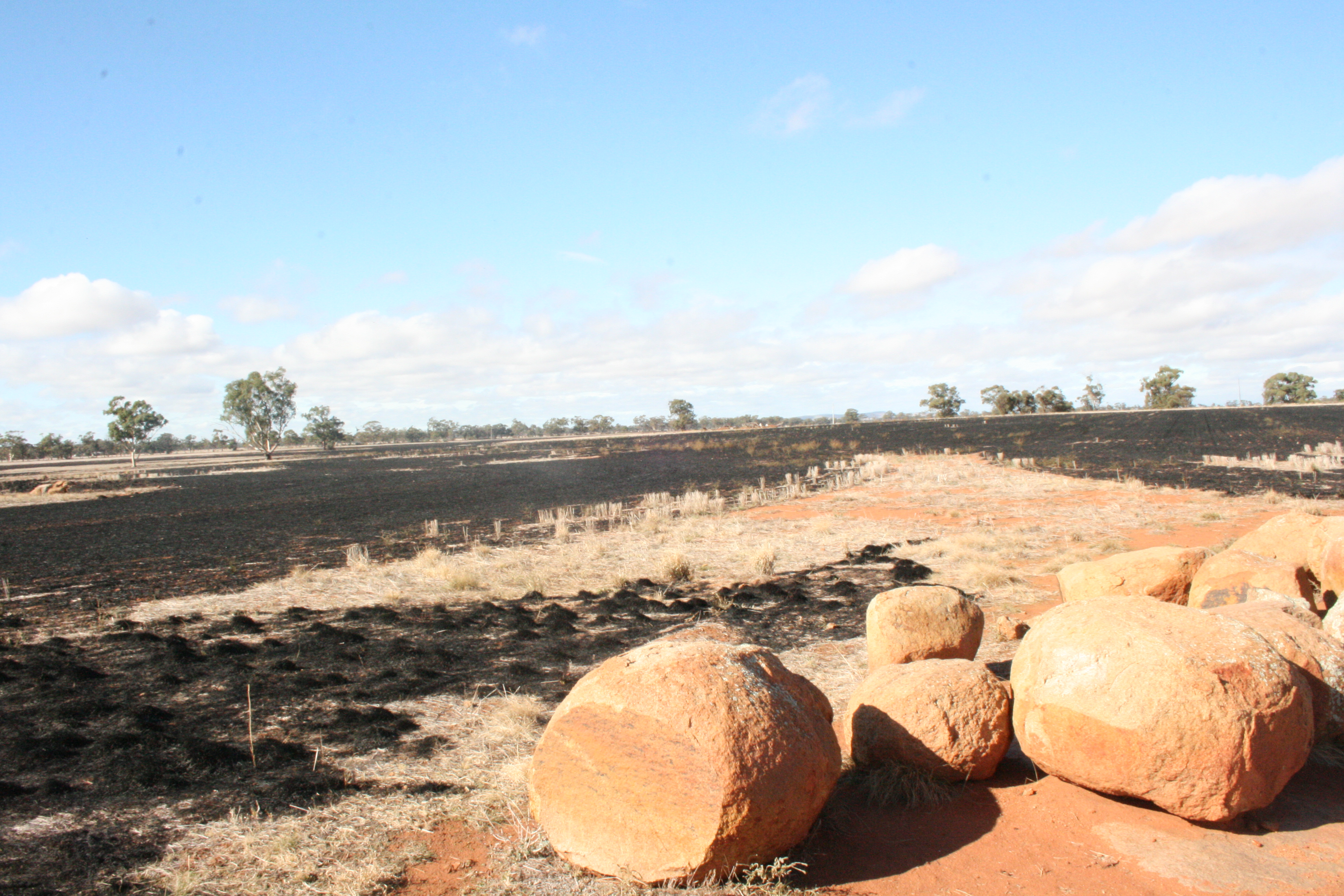
Burning of wheat stubble, near Barraport, Victoria, Australia

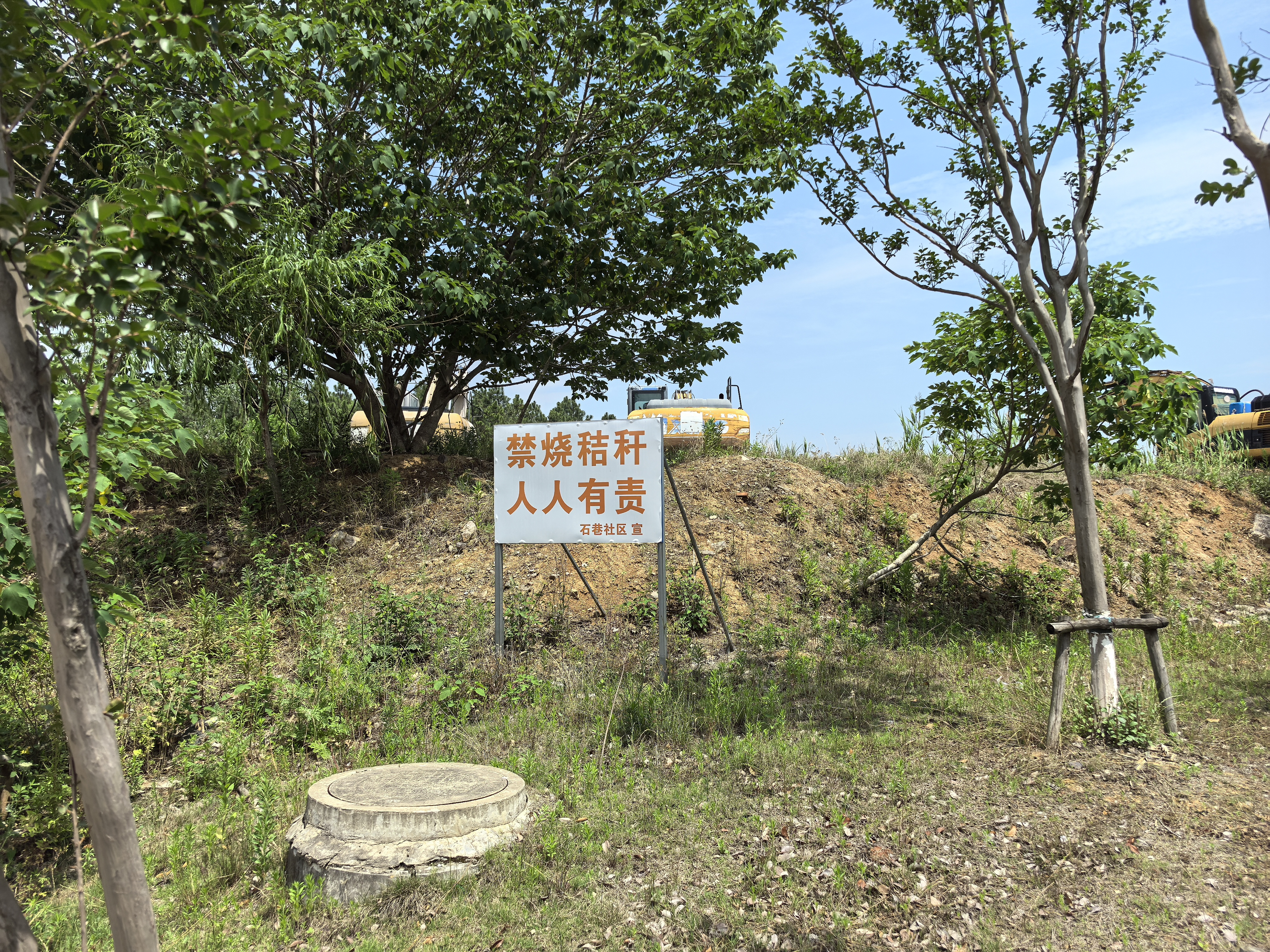
A sign in Nanjing, Jiangsu, China telling people not to burn stubble, the sign says "禁烧秸秆，人人有责"(lit. 'It's everyone's responsibility to refrain from burning stubble.').

- Stubble burning has been effectively prohibited since 1993 in the United Kingdom. A perceived increase in blackgrass, and particularly herbicide resistant blackgrass, led to a campaign by some arable farmers for its return.
- In Australia stubble burning is "not the preferred option for the majority of farmers" but is permitted and recommended in some circumstances. Farmers are advised to rake and burn windrows, and leave a fire break of 3 metres around any burn off.
- In the United States, fires are fairly common in mid-western states, but some states such as Oregon and Idaho regulate the practice.
- In the European Union, the Common Agricultural Policy strongly discourages stubble burning.
- In China, there is a government ban on stubble burning; however the practice remains fairly common.
- In northern India, despite a ban by the Punjab Pollution Control Board, stubble burning is still practiced. Authorities are starting to enforce this ban more proactively, and to research alternatives.
- Stubble burning is allowed by permit in some Canadian provinces, including Manitoba where 5% of farmers were estimated to do it in 2007.

=== India ===
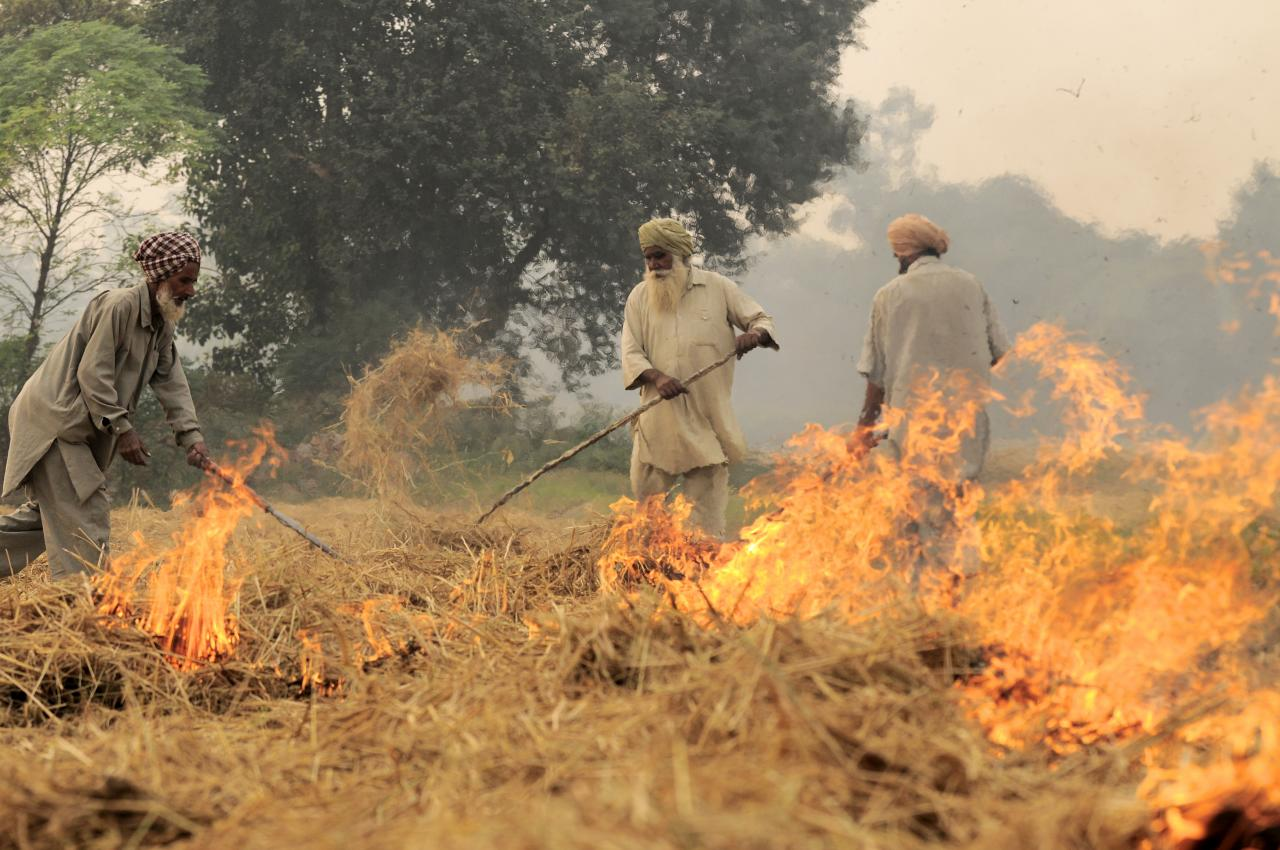
Burning of rice residues after harvest, to quickly prepare the land for wheat planting, around Sangrur, Punjab, India

Stubble burning in Punjab, Haryana, and Uttar Pradesh in north India has been cited as a major cause of air pollution in Delhi since 1990. Consequently, the government is considering implementation of the 1,600 km long and 5 km wide Great Green Wall of Aravalli. The smog that arises from the burning contributes fine black and brown carbon into the atmosphere which affects light absorption. As the weather is cooler in November in India, the stubble burning generates a thick haze of fog, dust, and industrial pollution. From April to May and October to November each year, farmers mainly in Punjab, Haryana, and Uttar Pradesh burn an estimated 35 million tons of crop waste from their wheat and paddy fields after harvesting as a low-cost straw-disposal practice to reduce the turnaround time between harvesting and sowing for the first (summer) crop and the second (winter) crop. Smoke from this burning produces a cloud of particulates visible from space and has produced what has been described as a "toxic cloud" in New Delhi, resulting in declarations of an air-pollution emergency. For this, the NGT (National Green Tribunal) instituted a fine of ₹2 lakh on the Delhi Government for failing to file an action plan providing incentives and infrastructural assistance to farmers to stop them from burning crop residue to prevent air pollution.

Although harvesters such as the Indian-manufactured "Happy Seeder" that shred the crop residues into small pieces and uniformly spread them across the field are available as an alternative to burning stubble, and crops such as millets and maize can be grown as a sustainable alternative to rice and wheat in order to conserve water, some farmers complain that the cost of these machines is a significant financial burden, with the crops not incurred under MSP prices when compared to burning the fields and purchasing crops that are produced under MSP prices.

The Indian Agricultural Research Institute, developed an enzyme bio-decomposer solution, that can be sprayed after the harvest, to increase organic carbon in the soil and maintain overall soil health. In 2021, they began licensing its use to various companies. In May 2022, the Government of Punjab announced they will purchase maize, bajra, sunflower and moong crops at MSP, encouraging farmers to adopt less water consuming options as a sustainable alternative to paddy and wheat in the wake of fast-depleting groundwater.

==== Pollution from stubble burning in India ====
A recent study in 2020 showed that the country created 600-700 million tonnes of crop residue and is choking cities. People in India are awaiting sustainable management to reduce the pollution. The areas that are largely contributing to the stubble burning pollutants are Uttar Pradesh, Punjab, and Haryana which is spreading to the border of Uttarakhand. The unsustainable use of alternating wheat-rice cropping patterns is exhausting natural resources like water, soil, and forest areas. In one year the emissions from the crop burning can be 17 times the total annual particulate pollution and the crop residue carbon dioxide submissions are 64 times the element emissions in Delhi. The crops that are typically burned include rice, wheat, maize, millet, and sugarcane, all of which have large investment returns and also leave a residue on the field after being cut. After 1 tonne of crop residue is burnt in a field there is a release of 1,400 kg of carbon dioxide (CO_{2}), 58 kg of Carbon Monoxide (CO), 11 kg of particulate matter, 4.9 kg of nitrogen oxides (NO_{x}), and 1.2 kg of sulfur dioxide (SO_{2}). Stubble burning also depletes groundwater and the lack of attention to the issue has led Indian civilians to feel hopeless for effective government interventional responses.

== Major incidents ==
Independent satellite evaluations of agricultural stubble burning in northern India during the 2026 post-monsoon harvest season revealed notable differences with official government totals. Hiren Jethva, a scientist at NASA and Morgan State University, estimated that approximately 34,000 fires occurred throughout Punjab and Haryana beginning on 1 October, despite the Commission for Air Quality Management (CAQM) reporting 4,459 fires in Punjab through early November.

The difference was explained by farmers moving burning times to the late afternoon, which prevented polar-orbiting satellites like NOAA-20's VIIRS and Aqua's MODIS from using their customary overpass windows. To arrive at the revised estimate, Jethva calibrated geostationary INSAT-3DS thermal anomaly data and late-afternoon Aqua MODIS data.

== See also ==
- Slash-and-burn
