= IARC group 1 =

Classification

IARC group 1 carcinogens are substances, chemical mixtures, and exposure circumstances which have been classified as carcinogenic to humans by the International Agency for Research on Cancer (IARC). This category is used when there is sufficient evidence of carcinogenicity in humans. Exceptionally, an agent (chemical mixture) may be placed in this category when evidence of carcinogenicity in humans is less than sufficient, but when there is sufficient evidence of carcinogenicity in experimental animals and strong evidence in exposed humans that the agent (mixture) acts through a relevant mechanism of carcinogenicity.

This list focuses on the hazard linked to the agents. This means that while carcinogens are capable of causing cancer, it does not take their risk into account, which is the probability of causing a cancer, given the level of exposure to this carcinogen. The list is up to date as of January 2026, including all agents classified by Volumes 1–140 of the IARC Monographs.

== Agents ==
Agents Classified by the IARC Monographs, Volumes 1–140
CAS No.	Agent	Volume	Volume publication year	Evaluation year	Additional information
	Clonorchis sinensis (infection with)	61, 100B	2012	2009	
	Helicobacter pylori (infection with)	61, 100B	2012	2009	
	Opisthorchis viverrini (infection with)	61, 100B	2012	2009	
	Schistosoma haematobium (infection with)	61, 100B	2012	2009	
	Acheson process, occupational exposure associated with	111	2017	2014	
	Acid mists, strong inorganic	54, 100F	2012	2009	
	Alcoholic beverages	44, 96, 100E	2012	2009	
	Aluminium production	34, Sup 7, 92, 100F	2012	2009	
	Areca nut	85, 100E	2012	2009	
	Auramine production	Sup 7, 99, 100F	2012	2009	
	Automotive gasoline	45, 138	In prep.	2025	
	Benzidine, dyes metabolized to	99, 100F	2012	2009	Overall evaluation upgraded to Group 1 based on mechanistic and other relevant data
	Betel quid with tobacco	Sup 7, 85, 100E	2012	2009	
	Betel quid without tobacco	Sup 7, 85, 100E	2012	2009	
	Coal gasification	Sup 7, 92, 100F	2012	2009	
	Coal, indoor emissions from household combustion of	95, 100E	2012	2009	
	Coke production	Sup 7, 92, 100F	2012	2009	
	Engine exhaust, diesel	46, 105	2014	2012	
	Epstein-Barr virus	70, 100B	2012	2009	
	Estrogen therapy, postmenopausal	72, 100A	2012	2008	There is "evidence suggesting lack of carcinogenicity" for estrogen-only menopausal therapy in humans and cancer of the colorectum. An inverse association has been observed between estrogen-only menopausal therapy and cancer of the colorectum.
	Estrogen-progestogen menopausal therapy (combined)	72, 91, 100A	2012	2008	
	Estrogen-progestogen oral contraceptives (combined)	72, 91, 100A	2012	2008	There is "evidence suggesting lack of carcinogenicity" for combined estrogen-progestogen oral contraceptives in humans and cancers of the endometrium, ovary, and colorectum. An inverse association has been observed between combined estrogen-progestogen oral contraceptives and cancers of the endometrium, ovary, and colorectum.
	Firefighter (occupational exposure as a)	98, 132	2023 online	2022	
	Fission products, including strontium-90	100D	2012	2009	
	Fluoro-edenite fibrous amphibole	111	2017	2014	
	Haematite mining (underground)	1, Sup 7, 100D	2012	2009	
	Hepatitis B virus (chronic infection with)	59, 100B	2012	2009	
	Hepatitis C virus (chronic infection with)	59, 100B	2012	2009	
	Hepatitis D virus (HDV)	59, 139	In prep.	2025	
	Human T-cell lymphotropic virus type I	67, 100B	2012	2009	
	Human immunodeficiency virus type 1 (infection with)	67, 100B	2012	2009	
	Human papillomavirus (HPV) type 16	64, 90, 100B	2012	2009	The HPV types that have been classified as carcinogenic to humans can differ by an order of magnitude in risk for cervical cancer
	Human papillomavirus (HPV) type 18	64, 90, 100B	2012	2009	The HPV types that have been classified as carcinogenic to humans can differ by an order of magnitude in risk for cervical cancer
	Human papillomavirus (HPV) type 33	64, 90, 100B	2012	2009	The HPV types that have been classified as carcinogenic to humans can differ by an order of magnitude in risk for cervical cancer
	Human papillomavirus (HPV) types 31, 35, 39, 45, 51, 52, 56, 58, 59	64, 90, 100B	2012	2009	The HPV types that have been classified as carcinogenic to humans can differ by an order of magnitude in risk for cervical cancer
	Ionizing radiation (all types)	100D	2012	2009	
	Iron and steel founding (occupational exposure during)	34, Sup 7, 100F	2012	2009	
	Isopropyl alcohol manufacture using strong acids	Sup 7, 100F	2012	2009	
	Kaposi sarcoma herpesvirus	70, 100B	2012	2009	
	Leather dust	100C	2012	2009	
	MOPP and other combined chemotherapy including alkylating agents	Sup 7, 100A	2012	2008	
	Magenta production	Sup 7, 57, 99, 100F	2012	2009	
	Merkel cell polyomavirus (MCPyV)	104, 139	In prep.	2025	
	Mineral oils, untreated or mildly treated	33, Sup 7, 100F	2012	2009	
	Neutron radiation	75, 100D	2012	2009	Overall evaluation upgraded to Group 1 with supporting evidence from other relevant data
	Nickel compounds	Sup 7, 49, 100C	2012	2009	
	Opium consumption	126	2021 online	2020	
	Outdoor air pollution	109	2016	2013	
	Outdoor air pollution, particulate matter in	109	2016	2013	
	Painter (occupational exposure as a)	47, 98, 100F	2012	2009	
	Phenacetin, analgesic mixtures containing	Sup 7, 100A	2012	2008	
	Polychlorinated biphenyls, dioxin-like, with a Toxicity Equivalency Factor (TEF) according to WHO (PCBs 77, 81, 105, 114, 118, 123, 126, 156, 157, 167, 169, 189)	107	2016	2013	Overall evaluation upgraded to Group 1 with strong supporting evidence from other relevant data
	Processed meat (consumption of)	114	2018	2015	
	Radioiodines, including iodine-131	78, 100D	2012	2009	
	Radionuclides, alpha-particle-emitting, internally deposited	78, 100D	2012	2009	Specific radionuclides for which there is sufficient or limited evidence in humans are also listed individually as Group 1 agents
	Radionuclides, beta-particle-emitting, internally deposited	78, 100D	2012	2009	Specific radionuclides for which there is sufficient evidence in humans are also listed individually as Group 1 agents
	Rubber manufacturing industry	28, Sup 7, 100F	2012	2009	
	Salted fish, Chinese-style	56, 100E	2012	2009	
	Solar radiation (see Ultraviolet radiation (wavelengths 100–400 nm, encompassing UVA, UVB, and UVC); Ultraviolet radiation from welding; and Ultraviolet-emitting tanning devices)	55, 100D	2012	2009	
	Soot (as found in occupational exposure of chimney sweeps)	35, Sup 7, 92, 100F	2012	2009	
	Tobacco smoke, secondhand	83, 100E	2012	2009	
	Tobacco smoking	83, 100E	2012	2009	
	Tobacco, smokeless	Sup 7, 89, 100E	2012	2009	
	Ultraviolet radiation from welding (see Ultraviolet radiation (wavelengths 100–400 nm, encompassing UVA, UVB, and UVC); Ultraviolet-emitting tanning devices; and Solar radiation)	100D, 118	2018 online	2017	Volume 100D concluded that there is sufficient evidence for ocular melanoma in welders; Volume 118 concluded that ultraviolet emissions from welding are carcinogenic to humans (Group 1; there is sufficient evidence in humans for the carcinogenicity of ultraviolet radiation from welding)
	Ultraviolet radiation (wavelengths 100–400 nm, encompassing UVA, UVB, and UVC) (see Ultraviolet radiation from welding; Ultraviolet-emitting tanning devices; and Solar radiation)	55, 100D	2012	2017	Overall evaluation upgraded to Group 1 based on mechanistic and other relevant data
	Ultraviolet-emitting tanning devices (see Ultraviolet radiation (wavelengths 100–400 nm, encompassing UVA, UVB, and UVC); Ultraviolet radiation from welding; and Solar radiation)	100D	2012	2009	
	Welding fumes	49, 118	2018 online	2017	
	Wood dust	62, 100C	2012	2009	
	X- and Gamma-Radiation	75, 100D	2012	2009	
10043-92-2	Radon-222 and its decay products	43, 78, 100D	2012	2009	
101-14-4	4,4'-Methylenebis(2-chloroaniline) (MOCA)	Sup 7, 57, 99, 100F	2012	2009	Overall evaluation upgraded to Group 1 based on mechanistic and other relevant data
104987-11-3	Tacrolimus	137	In prep.	2024	
10540-29-1	Tamoxifen	66, 100A	2012	2008	There is "evidence suggesting lack of carcinogenicity" for tamoxifen in humans and cancer of the female breast. An inverse association has been observed between tamoxifen and cancer of the female breast.
106-99-0	1,3-Butadiene	Sup 7, 54, 71, 97, 100F	2012	2009	
107-13-1	Acrylonitrile	19, Sup 7, 71, 136	2025 online	2024	
13233-32-4	Radium-224 and its decay products	78, 100D	2012	2009	
1332-21-4; 12172-73-5; 12001-29-5; 12001-28-4	Asbestos (all forms, including actinolite, amosite, anthophyllite, chrysotile, crocidolite, tremolite)	14, Sup 7, 100C	2012	2009	Mineral substances (e.g. talc or vermiculite) that contain asbestos should also be regarded as carcinogenic to humans; These CAS Nos are for substances that CAS does not treat in its regular CA index
1336-36-3	Polychlorinated biphenyls	18, Sup 7, 107	2016	2013	
137234-62-9	Voriconazole	137	In prep.	2024	
13909-09-6	1-(2-Chloroethyl)-3-(4-methylcyclohexyl)-1-nitrosourea (Methyl-CCNU) (Semustine)	Sup 7, 100A	2012	2008	
13982-63-3	Radium-226 and its decay products	78, 100D	2012	2009	
1402-68-2	Aflatoxins	Sup 7, 56, 82, 100F	2012	2009	
14596-37-3	Phosphorus-32, as phosphate	78, 100D	2012	2009	
148-82-3	Melphalan	9, Sup 7, 100A	2012	2008	
14808-60-7	Silica dust, crystalline, in the form of quartz or cristobalite	Sup 7, 68, 100C	2012	2009	
15262-20-1	Radium-228 and its decay products	78, 100D	2012	2009	
16543-55-8; 64091-91-4	N'-Nitrosonornicotine (NNN) and 4-(N-Nitrosomethylamino)-1-(3-pyridyl)-1-butanone (NNK)	Sup 7, 89, 100E	2012	2009	Overall evaluation upgraded to Group 1 based on mechanistic and other relevant data
1746-01-6	2,3,7,8-Tetrachlorodibenzo-para-dioxin	Sup 7, 69, 100F	2012	2009	
18540-29-9	Chromium (VI) compounds	Sup 7, 49, 100C	2012	2009	
298-81-7	Methoxsalen (8-methoxypsoralen) plus ultraviolet A radiation	24, Sup 7, 100A	2012	2008	
299-75-2	Treosulfan	26, Sup 7, 100A	2012	2008	
305-03-3	Chlorambucil	26, Sup 7, 100A	2012	2008	
313-67-7	Aristolochic acid	82, 100A	2012	2008	Overall evaluation upgraded to Group 1 based on mechanistic and other relevant data
313-67-7	Aristolochic acid, plants containing	82, 100A	2012	2008	
33419-42-0	Etoposide	76, 100A	2012	2008	Overall evaluation upgraded to Group 1 based on mechanistic and other relevant data
33419-42-0; 15663-27-1; 11056-06-7	Etoposide in combination with cisplatin and bleomycin	76, 100A	2012	2008	
335-67-1	Perfluorooctanoic acid (PFOA)	110, 135	2025 online	2023	
446-86-6	Azathioprine	26, Sup 7, 100A	2012	2008	
494-03-1	Chlornaphazine	4, Sup 7, 100A	2012	2008	
50-00-0	Formaldehyde	Sup 7, 62, 88, 100F	2012	2009	
50-18-0; 6055-19-2	Cyclophosphamide	26, Sup 7, 100A	2012	2008	
50-32-8	Benzo[a]pyrene	Sup 7, 92, 100F	2012	2009	Overall evaluation upgraded to Group 1 based on mechanistic and other relevant data
505-60-2	Sulfur mustard	9, Sup 7, 100F	2012	2009	
52-24-4	Thiotepa	Sup 7, 50, 100A	2012	2008	
542-88-1; 107-30-2	Bis(chloromethyl)ether; chloromethyl methyl ether (technical-grade)	4, Sup 7, 100F	2012	2009	
55-98-1	Busulfan	4, Sup 7, 100A	2012	2008	
56-53-1	Diethylstilbestrol	21, Sup 7, 100A	2012	2008	
57117-31-4	2,3,4,7,8-Pentachlorodibenzofuran	100F	2012	2009	Overall evaluation upgraded to Group 1 based on mechanistic and other relevant data
57465-28-8	3,3',4,4',5-Pentachlorobiphenyl (PCB-126)	100F	2012	2009	See Polychlorinated biphenyls, dioxin-like, with a TEF according to WHO
58-89-9	Lindane	113	2018	2015	
58-93-5	Hydrochlorothiazide	50, 108, 137	In prep.	2024	
59865-13-3; 79217-60-0	Ciclosporin	50, 100A	2012	2008	
62-44-2	Phenacetin	24, Sup 7, 100A	2012	2008	Overall evaluation upgraded to Group 1 with supporting evidence from other relevant data
64-17-5	Ethanol in alcoholic beverages	96, 100E	2012	2009	
65996-93-2	Coal-tar pitch	35, Sup 7, 100F	2012	2009	
66733-21-9	Erionite	42, Sup 7, 100C	2012	2009	
68308-34-9	Shale oils	35, Sup 7, 100F	2012	2009	
71-43-2	Benzene	29, Sup 7, 100F, 120	2018	2017	
7440-07-5	Plutonium	78, 100D	2012	2009	
7440-29-1	Thorium-232 and its decay products	78, 100D	2012	2009	
7440-38-2	Arsenic and inorganic arsenic compounds	23, Sup 7, 100C	2012	2009	
7440-41-7	Beryllium and beryllium compounds	Sup 7, 58, 100C	2012	2009	
7440-43-9	Cadmium and cadmium compounds	58, 100C	2012	2009	
7440-61-1	Uranium, mixture of isotopes (see Radionuclides, alpha-particle-emitting, internally deposited)	78, 100D	2012	2009	Uranium was listed as a Group 1 agent as a member of the family, Radionuclides, alpha-particle-emitting, internally deposited. There was limited evidence for the carcinogenicity of mixtures of uranium isotopes, with positive associations for lung cancer
75-01-4	Vinyl chloride	Sup 7, 97, 100F	2012	2009	
75-07-0	Acetaldehyde associated with consumption of alcoholic beverages	100E	2012	2009	
75-21-8	Ethylene oxide	Sup 7, 60, 97, 100F	2012	2009	Overall evaluation upgraded to Group 1 based on mechanistic and other relevant data
78-87-5	1,2-Dichloropropane	41, Sup 7, 71, 110	2017	2014	
79-01-6	Trichloroethylene	Sup 7, 63, 106	2014	2012	
8007-45-2	Coal-tar distillation	92, 100F	2012	2009	
87-86-5	Pentachlorophenol	53, 71, 117	2019	2016	
91-59-8	2-Naphthylamine	4, Sup 7, 99, 100F	2012	2009	
92-67-1	4-Aminobiphenyl	1, Sup 7, 99, 100F	2012	2009	
92-87-5	Benzidine	29, Sup 7, 99, 100F	2012	2009	
95-53-4	ortho-Toluidine	Sup 7, 77, 99, 100F	2012	2009	

== See also ==
- IARC group 2A
- IARC group 2B
- IARC group 3
