= National Emissions Standards for Hazardous Air Pollutants =

US EPA air pollutant emission standards

The National Emission Standards for Hazardous Air Pollutants (NESHAP) are air pollution standards issued by the United States Environmental Protection Agency (EPA). The standards, authorized by the Clean Air Act, are for pollutants not covered by the National Ambient Air Quality Standards (NAAQS) that may cause an increase in fatalities or in serious, irreversible, or incapacitating illness.

== Maximum Achievable Control Technology standards ==
The standards for a particular source category require the maximum degree of emission reduction that the EPA determines to be achievable, which is known as the Maximum Achievable Control Technology (MACT) standards. These standards are authorized by Section 112 of the 1970 Clean Air Act and the regulations are published in the Code of Federal Regulations (CFR).

=== Pollutants ===
EPA regulates the following hazardous air pollutants with the MACT standards.

CAS Number	Chemical Name	Notes
75-07-0	Acetaldehyde	
60-35-5	Acetamide	
75-05-8	Acetonitrile	
98-86-2	Acetophenone (Methyl Phenyl Ketone)	
53-96-3	2-Acetylaminofluorene	
107-02-8	Acrolein	
79-06-1	Acrylamide	
79-10-7	Acrylic acid	
107-13-1	Acrylonitrile	
107-05-1	Allyl chloride (3-Chloropropene)	
92-67-1	4-Aminobiphenyl	
62-53-3	Aniline	
90-04-0	o-Anisidine	
1332-21-4	Asbestos	
71-43-2	Benzene	including benzene from gasoline
92-87-5	Benzidine	
98-07-7	Benzotrichloride	
100-44-7	Benzyl chloride	
92-52-4	Biphenyl	
117-81-7	Bis(2-ethylhexyl)phthalate (DEHP)	
542-88-1	Bis(chloromethyl)ether	
75-25-2	Bromoform (Tribromomethane)	
106-99-0	1,3-Butadiene	
156-62-7	Calcium cyanamide	
105-60-2	Caprolactam	Delisted on June 18, 1996
133-06-2	Captan	
63-25-2	Carbaryl	
75-15-0	Carbon disulfide	
56-23-5	Carbon tetrachloride (Tetrachloromethane)	
463-58-1	Carbonyl sulfide	
120-80-9	Catechol	
133-90-4	Chloramben	
57-74-9	Chlordane	
7782-50-5	Chlorine	
79-11-8	Chloroacetic acid	
532-27-4	2-Chloroacetophenone	
108-90-7	Chlorobenzene	
510-15-6	Chlorobenzilate	
67-66-3	Chloroform (Trichloromethane)	
107-30-2	Chloromethyl methyl ether	
126-99-8	Chloroprene	
1319-77-3	Cresols/Cresylic acid (isomers and mixture)	
95-48-7	o-Cresol	
108-39-4	m-Cresol	
106-44-5	p-Cresol	
98-82-8	Cumene	
94-75-7	2,4-D, salts and esters	
3547-04-4	Dichlorodiphenyldichloroethylene (DDE)	
334-88-3	Diazomethane	
132-64-9	Dibenzofurans	
96-12-8	1,2-Dibromo-3-chloropropane (DBCP)	
84-74-2	Dibutylphthalate	
106-46-7	1,4-Dichlorobenzene (p-Dichlorobenzene)	
91-94-1	3,3'-Dichlorobenzidine	
111-44-4	Dichloroethyl ether (Bis(2-chloroethyl)ether)	
542-75-6	1,3-Dichloropropene	
62-73-7	Dichlorvos	
111-42-2	Diethanolamine	
64-67-5	Diethyl sulfate	
119-90-4	3,3'-Dimethoxybenzidine	
60-11-7	Dimethyl aminoazobenzene	
119-93-7	3,3'-Dimethyl benzidine	
79-44-7	Dimethylcarbamoyl chloride	
68-12-2	Dimethyl formamide	
57-14-7	1,1-Dimethyl hydrazine	
131-11-3	Dimethyl phthalate	
77-78-1	Dimethyl sulfate	
121-69-7	N,N-Dimethylaniline	Clean Air Act erroneously lists N,N-Diethylaniline
534-52-1	4,6-Dinitro-o-cresol, and salts	
51-28-5	2,4-Dinitrophenol	
121-14-2	2,4-Dinitrotoluene	
123-91-1	1,4-Dioxane (1,4-Diethyleneoxide)	
122-66-7	1,2-Diphenylhydrazine	
106-89-8	Epichlorohydrin (l-Chloro-2,3-epoxypropane)	
106-88-7	1,2-Epoxybutane	
140-88-5	Ethyl acrylate	
100-41-4	Ethyl benzene	
51-79-6	Ethyl carbamate (Urethane)	
75-00-3	Ethyl chloride (Chloroethane)	
106-93-4	Ethylene dibromide (1,2-Dibromoethane)	
107-06-2	Ethylene dichloride (1,2-Dichloroethane)	
107-21-1	Ethylene glycol	
151-56-4	Ethylene imine (Aziridine)	
75-21-8	Ethylene oxide	
96-45-7	Ethylene thiourea	
75-34-3	Ethylidene dichloride (1,1-Dichloroethane)	
50-00-0	Formaldehyde	
76-44-8	Heptachlor	
118-74-1	Hexachlorobenzene	
87-68-3	Hexachlorobutadiene	
77-47-4	Hexachlorocyclopentadiene	
67-72-1	Hexachloroethane	
822-06-0	Hexamethylene-1,6-diisocyanate	
680-31-9	Hexamethylphosphoramide	
110-54-3	Hexane	
302-01-2	Hydrazine	
7647-01-0	Hydrochloric acid	
7664-39-3	Hydrogen fluoride (Hydrofluoric acid)	
7783-06-4	Hydrogen sulfide	Delisted on December 4, 1991
123-31-9	Hydroquinone	
78-59-1	Isophorone	
58-89-9	Lindane (all isomers)	
108-31-6	Maleic anhydride	
67-56-1	Methanol	
72-43-5	Methoxychlor	
74-83-9	Methyl bromide (Bromomethane)	
74-87-3	Methyl chloride (Chloromethane)	
71-55-6	Methyl chloroform (1,1,1-Trichloroethane)	
78-93-3	Methyl ethyl ketone (2-Butanone or MEK)	Delisted on December 19, 2005
60-34-4	Methyl hydrazine	
74-88-4	Methyl iodide (Iodomethane)	
108-10-1	Methyl isobutyl ketone (Hexone or MIBK)	currently under review for delisting
624-83-9	Methyl isocyanate	
80-62-6	Methyl methacrylate	
1634-04-4	Methyl tert-butyl ether	
101-14-4	4,4'-Methylene bis(2-chloroaniline)	
75-09-2	Methylene chloride (Dichloromethane)	
101-68-8	Methylene diphenyl diisocyanate (MDI)	currently under review for delisting
101-77-9	4,4'-Methylenedianiline	
91-20-3	Naphthalene	
98-95-3	Nitrobenzene	
92-93-3	4-Nitrobiphenyl	
100-02-7	4-Nitrophenol	
79-46-9	2-Nitropropane	
684-93-5	N-Nitroso-N-methylurea	
62-75-9	N-Nitrosodimethylamine	
59-89-2	N-Nitrosomorpholine	
56-38-2	Parathion	
82-68-8	Pentachloronitrobenzene (Quintobenzene)	
87-86-5	Pentachlorophenol	
108-95-2	Phenol	
106-50-3	p-Phenylenediamine	
75-44-5	Phosgene	
7803-51-2	Phosphine	
7723-14-0	Phosphorus	
85-44-9	Phthalic anhydride	
1336-36-3	Polychlorinated biphenyls (Aroclors)	
1120-71-4	1,3-Propane sultone	
57-57-8	beta-Propiolactone	
123-38-6	Propionaldehyde	
114-26-1	Propoxur (Baygon)	
78-87-5	Propylene dichloride (1,2-Dichloropropane)	
75-56-9	Propylene oxide	
75-55-8	1,2-Propylenimine (2-Methyl aziridine)	
91-22-5	Quinoline	
106-51-4	Quinone	
100-42-5	Styrene	
96-09-3	Styrene oxide	
1746-01-6	2,3,7,8-Tetrachlorodibenzo-p-dioxin	
79-34-5	1,1,2,2-Tetrachloroethane	
127-18-4	Tetrachloroethylene (Perchloroethylene)	
7550-45-0	Titanium tetrachloride	
108-88-3	Toluene	
95-80-7	2,4-Toluene diamine	
584-84-9	2,4-Toluene diisocyanate	
95-53-4	o-Toluidine	
8001-35-2	Toxaphene (chlorinated camphene)	
120-82-1	1,2,4-Trichlorobenzene	
79-00-5	1,1,2-Trichloroethane	
79-01-6	Trichloroethylene	
95-95-4	2,4,5-Trichlorophenol	
88-06-2	2,4,6-Trichlorophenol	
121-44-8	Triethylamine	
1582-09-8	Trifluralin	
540-84-1	2,2,4-Trimethylpentane	
108-05-4	Vinyl acetate	
593-60-2	Vinyl bromide (Bromoethene)	
75-01-4	Vinyl chloride (Chloroethene)	
75-35-4	Vinylidene chloride (1,1-Dichloroethylene)	
1330-20-7	Xylenes (isomers and mixture)	
95-47-6	o-Xylenes	
108-38-3	m-Xylenes	
106-42-3	p-Xylenes	
n/a	Antimony Compounds	
n/a	Arsenic Compounds	inorganic including arsine
n/a	Beryllium Compounds	
n/a	Cadmium Compounds	
n/a	Chromium Compounds	
n/a	Cobalt Compounds	
n/a	Coke Oven Emissions	
n/a	Cyanide Compounds^{1}	
n/a	Glycol ethers^{2}	
n/a	Lead Compounds	
n/a	Manganese Compounds	
n/a	Mercury Compounds	
n/a	Fine mineral fibers^{3}	
n/a	Nickel Compounds	
n/a	Polycyclic Organic Matter^{4}	
n/a	Radionuclides^{5}	including radon
n/a	Selenium Compounds	

For all listings above which contain the word "compounds" and for glycol ethers, the following applies: Unless otherwise specified, these listings are defined as including any unique chemical substance that contains the named chemical (i.e., antimony, arsenic, etc.) as part of that chemical's infrastructure.

- ^1 X'CN where X = H' or any other group where a formal dissociation may occur. For example, KCN or Ca(CN)_{2}
- ^2 Includes mono- and di- ethers of ethylene glycol, diethylene glycol, and triethylene glycol R−(OCH_{2}CH_{2})_{n}−OR' where

n = 1, 2, or 3
R = alkyl C7 (chain of 7 carbon atoms) or less; or phenyl or alkyl substituted phenyl
R' = H or alkyl C7 or less; or OR' consisting of carboxylic acid ester, sulfate, phosphate, nitrate, or sulfonate. Polymers are excluded from the glycol category, as well as surfactant alcohol ethoxylates (where R is an alkyl C8 or greater) and their derivatives, and ethylene glycol monobutyl ether (CAS 111-76-2).

- ^3 Includes mineral fiber emissions from facilities manufacturing or processing glass, rock, or slag fibers (or other mineral derived fibers) of average diameter 1 micrometer or less.
- ^4 Includes organic compounds with more than one benzene ring, and which have a boiling point greater than or equal to 100 °C.
- ^5 A type of atom which spontaneously undergoes radioactive decay.

== Pollution sources ==
Most air toxics originate from human-made sources, including mobile sources (e.g., cars, trucks, buses) and stationary sources (e.g., factories, oil refineries, power plants), as well as indoor sources (e.g., building materials and activities such as cleaning). There are two types of stationary sources that generate routine emissions of air toxics:

1. Major sources are defined as sources that emit 10 or more tons per year of any of the listed toxic air pollutants, or 25 or more tons per year of a mixture of air toxics. These sources may release air toxics from fugitive emissions (equipment leaks), when materials are transferred from one location to another, or during discharge through emission stacks or vents.
2. Area sources consist of smaller facilities that release lesser quantities of toxic pollutants into the air. Area sources are defined as sources that do not emit more than 10 tons per year of a single air toxic or more than 25 tons per year of a combination of air toxics. Although the emissions from individual area sources are often relatively small, collectively their emissions can be of concern, particularly where large numbers of sources are located in heavily populated areas.

EPA published its initial list of source categories in 1992. Subsequently the agency issued several revisions and updates to the list and the regulatory promulgation schedule. For each listed source category, EPA indicates whether the sources are considered to be major sources or area sources. The 1990 Clean Air Act Amendments direct EPA to set standards for all major sources of air toxics, and for some area sources that are of particular concern. EPA is required to review all source category regulations every eight years.

== See also ==
- Air pollution in the United States
- Mercury and Air Toxics Standards
