= Chlornaphazine =

Names
- Preferred IUPAC name N,N-Bis(2-chloroethyl)naphthalen-2-amine
- Other names Chlornapazine; 2-Naphthylbis(chloroethyl)amine

Identifiers
CAS Number	494-03-1
3D model (JSmol)	Interactive image
ChEMBL	ChEMBL2107519
ChemSpider	9885
ECHA InfoCard	100.007.078
KEGG	C16446
PubChem CID	10307
UNII	U46E473275
CompTox Dashboard (EPA)	DTXSID3060087
- InChI: InChI=1/C14H15Cl2N/c15-7-9-17(10-8-16)14-6-5-12-3-1-2-4-13(12)11-14/h1-6,11H,7-10H2 Key: XCDXSSFOJZZGQC-UHFFFAOYAW
- SMILES: ClCCN(c2ccc1c(cccc1)c2)CCCl

Properties
Chemical formula	C_{14}H_{15}Cl_{2}N
Molar mass	268.18 g·mol^{−1}
- Except where otherwise noted, data are given for materials in their standard state (at 25 °C [77 °F], 100 kPa). Infobox references

Chlornaphazine, a derivative of 2-naphthylamine, is a nitrogen mustard that was developed in the 1950s for the treatment of polycythemia and Hodgkin's disease. However, a high incidence of bladder cancers in patients receiving treatment with chlornaphthazine led to use of the drug being discontinued.

The International Agency for Research on Cancer has listed chlornaphazine as a human carcinogen.

Chlornaphazine appears as a brown solid or as colorless plates and has a boiling point of 210 °C at 5 mmHg.

== History ==
=== Medical use ===
Chlornaphazine was clinically used as a cytostatic agent for the treatment of Hodgkin's disease and polycythemia vera in multiple countries including Denmark and Italy.

=== Discontinued use ===
Chlornaphazine was discontinued as a clinical drug due to sufficient evidence for carcinogenicity in humans. The drug caused cancer of the urinary bladder. In the Medical Department of the Finsen Institute in Copenhagen, Danish researchers observed many patients over the years with polycythemia vera who had been administered different total doses of chlornaphazine. The initial therapeutic results reported in 1961 indicated that 75% of 32 patients that used chlornaphazine experienced a favorable effect. At the time of the analysis, seven patients died and in the autopsy of one of these patients, a carcinoma of the bladder was accidentally found. In a subsequent study from the Medical Department of the Finsen Institute, 61 patients diagnosed with polycythemia vera that had been treated with chlornaphazine were followed. It was found that among the 61 patients, eight patients developed an invasive carcinoma of the bladder, another eight patients had abnormal urinary cytology, and five patients had developed a papillary carcinoma grade II of the bladder. This led to the discontinuation of chlornaphazine in Denmark in 1963.

== Mechanism of action ==
Chlornaphazine is a nitrogen mustard that was predominantly used in Scandinavia as a treatment for polycythemia and Hodgkin's disease. The possibility of nitrogen mustards to chemically inhibit abnormal cell growth was explored and accelerated through wartime studies of the physiological effects of war gases. The war gas known as nitrogen mustard appeared to be a potential drug for the treatment of leukemia, Hodgkin's disease, and lymphadenopathies in general due to its destructive effect on the bone marrow and particularly on the hemopoietic system. The anti-carcinoma activity of nitrogen mustards is based on their action on mitosis, inhibiting the growth of both normal and abnormal dividing cells. Due to the undesirable side effects of nitrogen mustard, chlornaphazine, another member of the nitrogen mustard series with a similar tumor-inhibiting capacity was developed. Just like the other active nitrogen mustards, chlornaphazine belongs to the direct-acting alkylating agents. It exerts its cytotoxic action by attaching an alkyl group to a lone pair of electrons on an atom of a wide variety of biological molecules by nucleophilic substitution. Through this covalent modification of DNA, chlornaphazine can interfere with essential processes in cancer cells, including DNA replication and protein synthesis. Since this drug is a bifunctional alkylator, it can react at two different sites in the DNA, forming intra- and interstrand cross-links. The structural modifications of DNA caused by chlornaphazine lead to misreading of the DNA code, the inhibition of DNA, RNA, and protein synthesis, and programmed cell death. Cancer cells are among the most affected since alkylating agents have their primary effect on rapidly proliferating cells which do not have time for DNA repair.

== Reactivity ==
The ability to alkylate DNA bases is the predominant aspect of the reactivity of chlornaphazine in the body. The N^{7} of guanine bases is the preferred position for alkylation since it is the most nucleophilic and accessible site. The mechanism of reaction with DNA proceeds through two successive S_{N}2 reactions in which the N(CH_{2}CH_{2}Cl)_{2} moiety of chlornaphazine is involved. In the first reaction, the nitrogen acts as a nucleophile to form an aziridinium ion by displacing the halogen. The aziridinium ion is subsequently attacked by nucleophilic sites in DNA. When these two steps are repeated with the second CH_{2}CH_{2}Cl side chain, intra- or interstrand cross-links can be formed.

== Metabolism ==
After oral administration and subsequent absorption, chlornaphazine is metabolized to 2-naphthylamine which is N-acetylated by N-acetyltransferase (NAT) 2 in the liver. This is a detoxification reaction since it leads to the formation of non-reactive compounds. Alternatively, CYP1A2, a member of the cytochrome P450 superfamily may convert 2-naphthylamine in its N-hydroxy metabolite. The N-hydroxy metabolite can be further metabolized in the liver or transported to the urinary bladder. In the liver, it can undergo S-glutathionylation catalyzed by glutathione S-transferase Mu 1 (GSTM1), which involves the substitution of the hydroxy group by glutathione. This reaction leads to the detoxification of the N-hydroxy metabolite. The other biotransformation that may occur in the liver is the conjugation with glucuronic acid for which the cosubstrate uridine diphosphate-glucuronic acid (UDPGA) and enzyme UDP-glucuronosyltransferase are required. The stability of the N-glucuronides at neutral pH allows the transport via the blood to the kidneys where they are excreted into the urine. Under the mildly acidic conditions of the urine, the glucuronide is hydrolyzed, liberating the N-hydroxy metabolite in the bladder. The bladder epithelium further activates the N-hydroxy amine to an arylnitrenium ion. A second mechanism through which the N-hydroxy metabolites can be activated to arylnitrenium ions is via NAT1-catalyzed O-acetylation in the bladder. The products of chlornaphazine biotransformation are eliminated in the urine.

== Efficacy ==
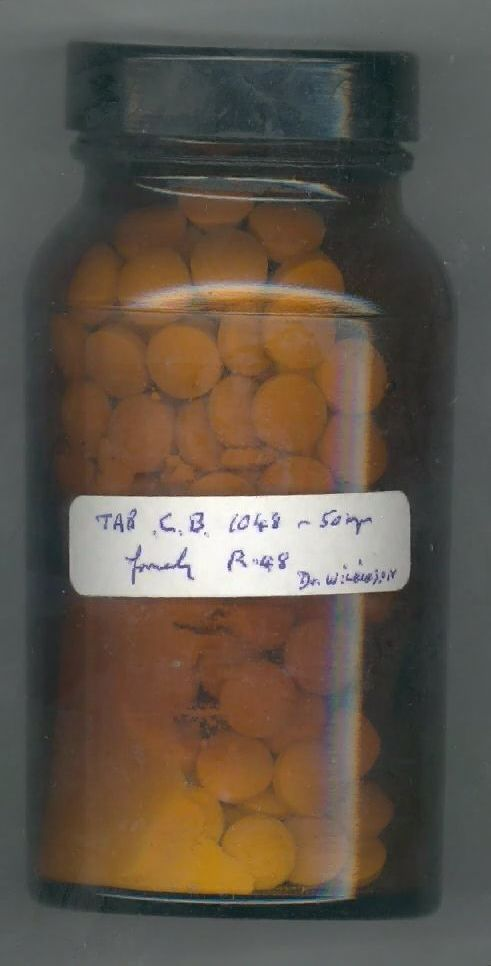
Jar of chlornaphazine used by J.F. Wilkinson in chemotherapy trials, 1950s

Due to its pronounced cytostatic effect, free solubility in water, and easy absorption from the intestinal tract, chlornaphazine appeared to be a suitable treatment for malignant systemic diseases such as Hodgkin's disease and polycythemia vera. Chlornaphazine was an effective medicine for treating fever, weight loss, itching, and sweating which are symptoms of advanced stages of Hodgkin's disease. These beneficial effects were notable when 200-400 mg chlornaphazine was administered daily for months to years. Hodgkin's disease can be treated with chemotherapy consisting of chlornaphazine alone or in combination with other cytostatic drugs. A study that investigated the efficacy of cytostatic treatment for Hodgkin's disease reported that 73% of the patients went into complete remission after receiving cytostatic drugs for 23 months. Chemotherapy can also be combined with radiotherapy. To patients who became resistant to radiation, nitrogen mustards such as chlornaphazine could be administered. In patients with Hodgkin's disease treated with nitrogen mustards tumor masses regressed rapidly. However, tumors reoccurred more rapidly compared to X-ray therapy. Although chlornaphazine was an effective treatment for polycythemia vera, the risks of chlornaphazine were too high making alternative treatments more advantageous.

== Adverse effects ==
Initially, it was reported that chlornaphazine has no major adverse effects since no immediate side effects were found. However, years later, multiple cases were reported of patients treated with chlornaphazine for Hodgkin's disease who were diagnosed with bladder cancer several years after the chlornaphazine treatment had been stopped. In addition, 30% of the polycythemia patients treated with chlornaphazine had developed bladder cancer. These cases and additional research shed light on this alarming side effect of chlornaphazine. It was concluded that chlornaphazine treatment can induce bladder cancer 3 to 10 years after treatment. Development of bladder cancer was only observed in patients who had received a minimal total dose of 100 g chlornaphazine and therefore this late adverse effect is dose-dependent. Common adverse effects of alkylating agents in general are increased risk of malignancy, impaired spermatogenesis, intestinal mucosal damage, alopecia, anemia, pancytopenia, and amenorrhea.

== Toxicity ==
Cancer of the urinary bladder has been observed in many cases treated with chlornaphazine. It has been implied that the carcinogenic effect is caused by the metabolites, whereas the chemotherapeutic action is due to the drug itself. Chlornaphazine contains a nitrogen mustard group at the basic molecule of 2-naphthylamine. The biotransformation of chlornaphazine involves the cleavage of the chloroethyl group, resulting in the formation of 2-naphthylamine. The carcinogenic effect of this compound on the human urinary bladder is well known. The bioactivation of 2-naphthylamine in the liver and urinary bladder results in the formation of products that readily decompose to form reactive arylnitrenium ions. These ions are reactive electrophiles that form adducts by covalently binding to nucleophilic sites on proteins, DNA, and RNA. The tumor induction of chlornaphazine derivatives is specific to the urinary bladder since the carcinogenic metabolites can only be liberated by the acidic environment of urine.

== Effects on animals ==
The mutagenic effects of chornaphazine are studied in multiple animal models. Many studies have shown that rodents are inappropriate animal models to study the carcinogenicity of chlornaphazine due to differences in metabolic pathways between humans and rodents. Therefore, rodents treated with chlornaphazine usually do not develop bladder cancer like humans. Chlornaphazine was shown to cause chromosomal abnormalities in Chinese hamster lung cells, mutations in lymphoma cells of mice, and spontaneous in vitro synthesis of DNA in rat hepatocytes. In addition, chlornaphazine induces chromosomal abnormalities in erythrocytes in both mouse and rat bone marrow. It has been reported that chornaphazine is a genetic hazard to the offspring of mice previously exposed to this drug since it is highly mutagenic in post-meiotic male germ cells. Moreover, mice injected with chlornaphazine intraperitoneally developed lung tumors whereas rats injected with chlornaphazine subcutaneously developed local sarcomas. In contrast to rodents, dogs are suitable for studying bladder carcinogens, such as chlornaphazine, since the metabolism of aromatic amines in dogs is similar to that in humans due to the comparable urine pH and urination frequency of both species. Animal experiments had also been performed to expand the knowledge of the carcinogenic effects of chlornaphazine's metabolite 2-naphthylamine. Like in humans, 2-naphthylamine induces bladder tumors in dogs, monkeys, and hamsters. Bladder cancer can be induced in rats, but 2-naphthylamine is a very weak carcinogen in rats due to their urine pH, urination frequency, and resorption. In mice, 2-naphthylamine caused an increase in hepatomas, liver adenomas, and cholangiomas.
