= 4-Aminobiphenyl =

Names
- Preferred IUPAC name [1,1′-Biphenyl]-4-amine
- Other names 4-Aminobiphenyl, xenylamine, 4-ABP; 4-Aminodiphenyl p-Aminobiphenyl p-Aminodiphenyl; 4-Phenylaniline

Identifiers
CAS Number	92-67-1
3D model (JSmol)	Interactive image
ChEBI	CHEBI:1784
ChEMBL	ChEMBL44201
ChemSpider	6835
ECHA InfoCard	100.001.980
EC Number	202-177-1
KEGG	C10998
PubChem CID	7102
RTECS number	DU8925000
UNII	16054949HJ
UN number	3077
CompTox Dashboard (EPA)	DTXSID5020071
- InChI: InChI=1S/C12H11N/c13-12-8-6-11(7-9-12)10-4-2-1-3-5-10/h1-9H,13H2 Key: DMVOXQPQNTYEKQ-UHFFFAOYSA-N; InChI=1/C12H11N/c13-12-8-6-11(7-9-12)10-4-2-1-3-5-10/h1-9H,13H2 Key: DMVOXQPQNTYEKQ-UHFFFAOYAX
- SMILES: c1ccccc1c2ccc(N)cc2

Properties
Chemical formula	C_{12}H_{11}N
Molar mass	169.227 g·mol^{−1}
Appearance	White solid
Odor	Floral
Density	1.16 g/cm^{3}
Melting point	52 to 54 °C (126 to 129 °F; 325 to 327 K)
Boiling point	302 °C (576 °F; 575 K)
Solubility in water	Slightly soluble in cold water, soluble in hot water
Vapor pressure	20 mbar (191 °C)
Acidity (pK_{a})	4.35 (conjugate acid; 18 °C, H_{2}O)

Hazards
- Occupational safety and health (OHS/OSH)
Main hazards	toxic and carcinogenic
- GHS labelling
Pictograms	(GHS07: Exclamation mark) (GHS08: Health hazard)
Signal word	Danger
Hazard statements	H302, H350
Precautionary statements	P203, P264, P270, P280, P301+P317, P318, P330, P405, P501
NFPA 704 (fire diamond)	2 1 0
Flash point	147 °C (297 °F; 420 K)
Autoignition temperature	450 °C (842 °F; 723 K)
- NIOSH (US health exposure limits)
REL (Recommended)	carcinogen
IDLH (Immediate danger)	N.D.
- Except where otherwise noted, data are given for materials in their standard state (at 25 °C [77 °F], 100 kPa). verify (what is ?) Infobox references

4-Aminobiphenyl (4-ABP) is an organic compound with the formula C_{12}H_{11}N or C_{6}H_{5}C_{6}H_{4}NH_{2}. It is an amine derivative of biphenyl. It is a colorless solid, although aged samples can appear colored. 4-Aminobiphenyl was commonly used in the past as a rubber antioxidant and an intermediate for dyes. It is toxic, with the most common exposure route through contact with chemical dyes or inhalation of cigarette smoke. Research has shown that 4-aminobiphenyl is carcinogenic, typically causing bladder cancer in humans and dogs. Due to its pronounced toxic and carcinogenic effects, commercial production of 4-aminobiphenyl ceased in the United States in the 1950s.

== Synthesis and reactivity ==
Like other aniline derivatives, 4-aminobiphenyl is weakly basic. It is prepared by reduction of 4-nitrobiphenyl:

C_{6}H_{5}−C_{6}H_{4}NO_{2} + 3 H_{2} → C_{6}H_{5}−C_{6}H_{4}NH_{2} + 2 H_{2}O

During this reaction, sodium borohydride can be used as a hydrogen source. An alternative synthesis, in principle, allows 4-ABP to be obtained by reduction of 4-azidobiphenyl with diphosphorus tetraiodide (P_{2}I_{4}).

== Mechanism of action ==
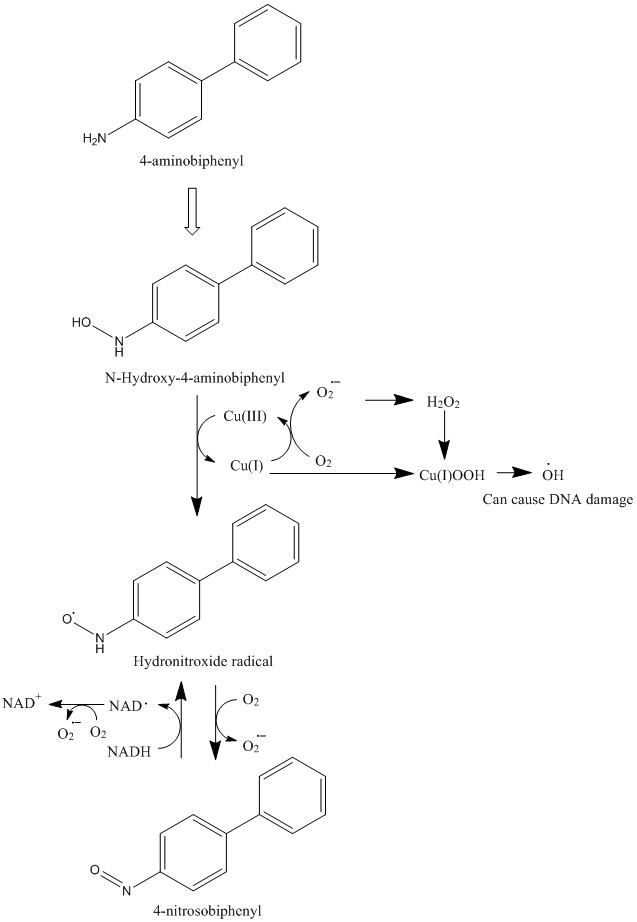
Hypothesized mechanism of toxicity for 4-aminobiphenyl.

=== General mechanism ===
4-ABP is carcinogenic, thought to be mediated by formation of DNA adducts. 4-ABP is oxidized in the liver, giving the N-hydroxy derivative (4-aminobiphenyl-(NHOH)) by an isozyme of cytochrome P450. The final products of this metabolism are aryl nitrenium ions, which form DNA adducts. During this process reactive oxygen species may be produced and lead to oxidative DNA damage, playing a role in carcinogenesis. The N-hydroxy derivative causes oxidative DNA damage dramatically enhanced by NADH, which leads to oxidation of 4-ABP to a hydronitroxide radical. A linear correlation was found between adduct levels and the occurrence of liver tumors in female mice by comparing DNA adducts and tumorigenesis.

=== 4-ABP leading to mutation in p53 gene ===
4-ABP initiates bladder carcinogenesis by inducing a mutation in the p53 gene (which codes for tumor suppressor p53 proteins). This is observed in thirty to sixty percent of bladder cancer cases. Five p53 hotspots are known for bladder cancer. These are three CpG sites that are observed in other human cancers, which are on codons 175, 248 and 273. The other two codons, 280 and 285, do not have CpG sites. These sites are unique for mutation in initiating bladder cancer and other urinary tract cancers, in which the chemistry is not yet fully understood.

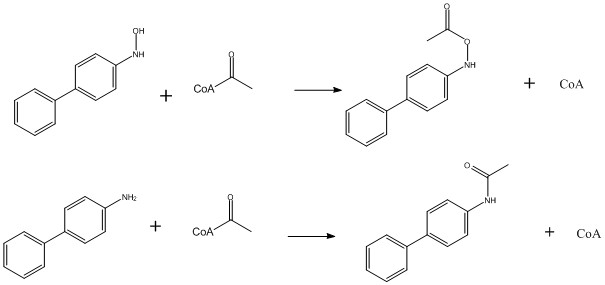
NAT1 and NAT2 can O-acetylate N-hydroxy-4-aminobiphenyl (above) and N-acetylate 4-amino biphenyl (below)

=== Metabolism process in humans ===
Cytochrome P450 1A2 oxidizes 4-ABP to N-hydroxy-4-aminobiphenyl. Following O-acetylation, the latter can form DNA adducts. O-Acetylation reactions are catalyzed by NAT, N-acetyltransferase; and UDP-glucuronosyltransferase (UGT) enzymes. Two different NAT enzymes can catalyze this reaction, NAT1 and NAT2. These enzymes can additionally N-acetylate 4-ABP. This acetylation is considered a detoxification step for aromatic amines that are present as environmental pollutants.

Glucuronidation represents a major metabolic pathway for carcinogenic aromatic amines. A certain human UGT catalyzes the formation of the N-glucuronide of 4-ABP. Glucuronidation results in inactivation and excretion, hence N-glucuronidation is a competing reaction with N-oxidation. 4-ABP is proposed to initiate bladder cancer by a mechanism involving hepatic N-oxidation and subsequent N-glucuronidation. The N-hydroxy aryl amine N-glucuronide conjugate is thought to be excreted from the liver and to build up in the bladder lumen. N-glucuronides of 4-aminobiphenyl and N-hydroxy-4-aminobiphenyl can be hydrolyzed by acidic urine to their corresponding arylamines, they can in turn enter the bladder epithelium and undergo further metabolism by peroxidation and/or O-acetylation to form DNA adducts.

== Toxicity ==
=== Human toxicity ===
Toxic fumes arise from 4-ABP when heated to decomposition. Excessive inhalation exposure of 4-aminobiphenyl may induce acute toxicity such as headache, lethargy, cyanosis and burning sensations in the urinary tract.

4-ABP is a human carcinogen, specifically to the tissues involving the urinary system, i.e., the bladder, ureter, and renal pelvis. In one study, out of 171 workers in a plant manufacturing 4-ABP, 11% developed bladder tumors. Tumors appeared on subjects which were exposed to 4-ABP in a range of duration from 1.5 to 19 years. 4-ABP can be metabolized by humans which the product may form adducts with DNA in human urothelial mucosa and bladder tumor tissues. Levels of these adducts in smokers of blond and black tobacco were found to be proportional to bladder cancer risk.

=== Animal toxicity ===
The LD_{50} (dogs, oral) is 25 mg/kg. The oral LD_{50} for rats is 500 mg/kg body weight, and for rabbits is 690 mg/kg body weight. Repeated oral administration of a 25% 4-ABP solution in olive oil led rabbits to weight loss, anemia, decrease in the number of lymphocytes, increase of granulocytes or the rod neutrophilic granulocyte and to a pronounced hematuria or hemoglobinuria.
