= N-acetyltransferase =

Class of enzymes

Arylamine N-acetyltransferase 2
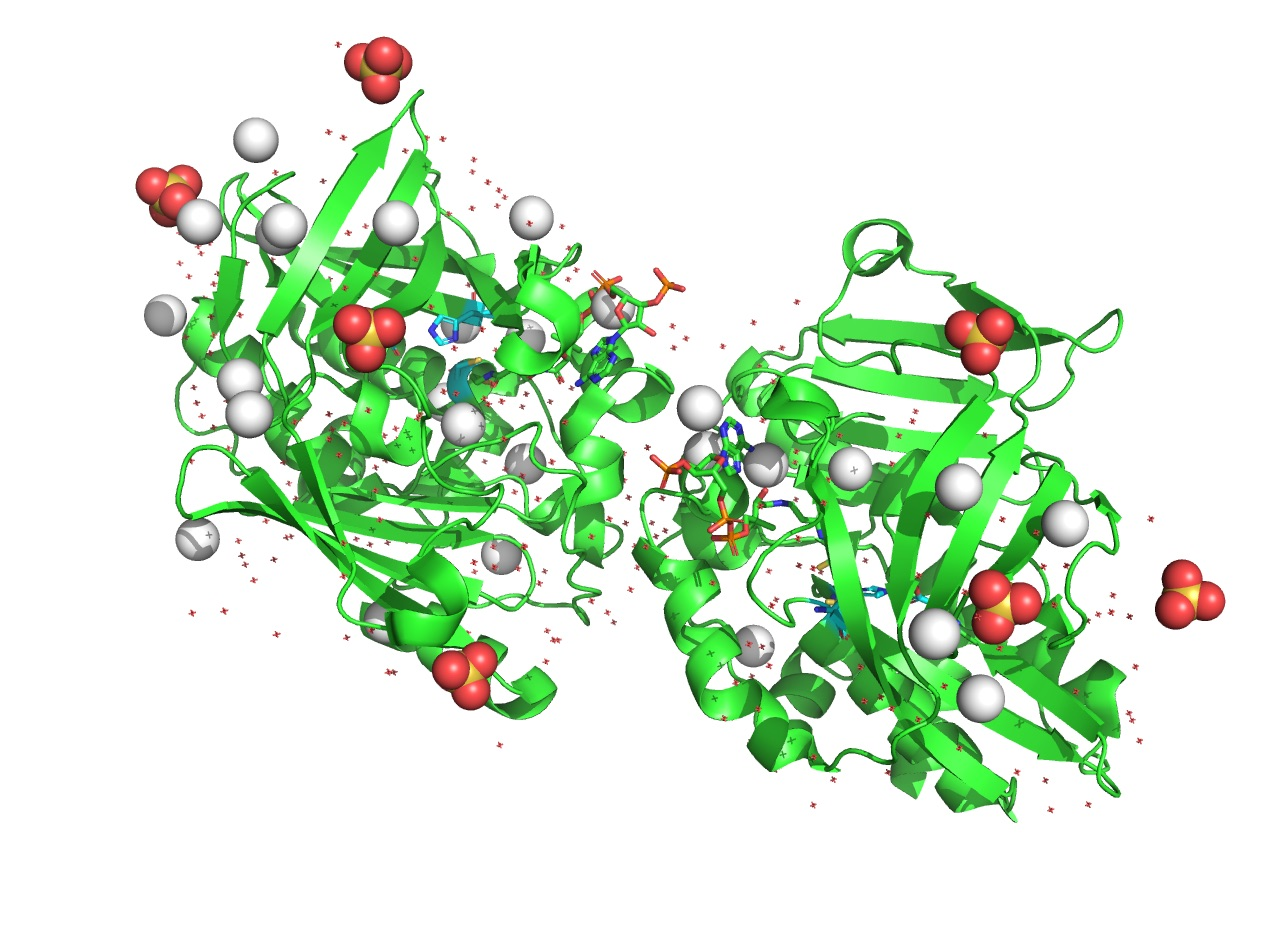
- A 3d cartoon depiction of human N-acetyltransferase 2

Identifiers
- EC no.: 2.3.1.5

Databases
- BRENDA: enzyme data
- ExPASy: NiceZyme view
- KEGG: enzyme entry
- MetaCyc: metabolic pathway
- Rhea: reactions
- PDB structures: RCSB PDB PDBe PDBsum
Search
- PMC: articles
- PubMed: articles
- NCBI: proteins

N-acetyltransferase (NAT) is an enzyme that catalyzes the transfer of acetyl groups from acetyl-CoA to arylamines, arylhydroxylamines and arylhydrazines. They have wide specificity for aromatic amines, particularly serotonin, and can also catalyze acetyl transfer between arylamines without CoA. N-acetyltransferases are cytosolic enzymes found in the liver and many tissues of most mammalian species, except the dog and fox, which cannot acetylate xenobiotics.

Acetyl groups are important in the conjugation of metabolites from the liver, to allow excretion of the byproducts (phase II metabolism). This is especially important in the metabolism and excretion of drug products (drug metabolism).

== Enzyme mechanism ==
NAT enzymes are differentiated by the presence of a conserved catalytic triad that favors aromatic amine and hydrazine substrates. NATs catalyze the acetylation of small molecules through a double displacement reaction called the ping pong bi bi reaction. The mechanism consists of two sequential reactions. In reaction one acetyl-CoA initially binds to the enzyme and acetylates Cys^{68}. In reaction two, after acetyl-CoA is released, the acetyl acceptor interacts with the acetylated enzyme to form product. This second reaction is independent of the acetyl donor since it leaves the enzyme before the acetyl acceptor binds. However, like with many ping pong bi bi reactions, its possible there is competition between the acetyl donor and acetyl acceptor for the unacetylated enzyme. This leads to substrate-dependent inhibition at high concentrations.

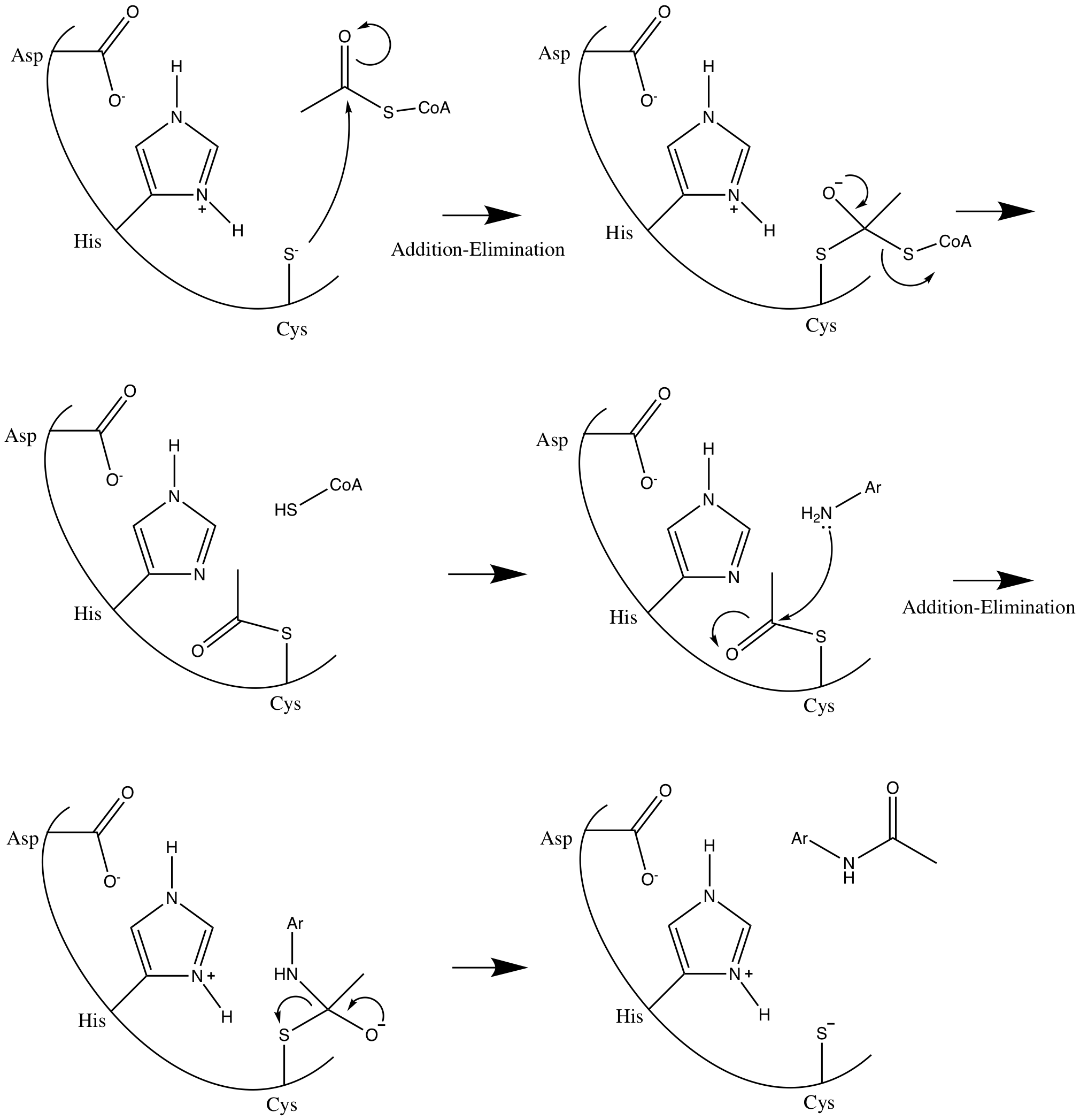
Depiction of the N-acetyltransfersase enzyme mechanism.

== Enzyme structure ==
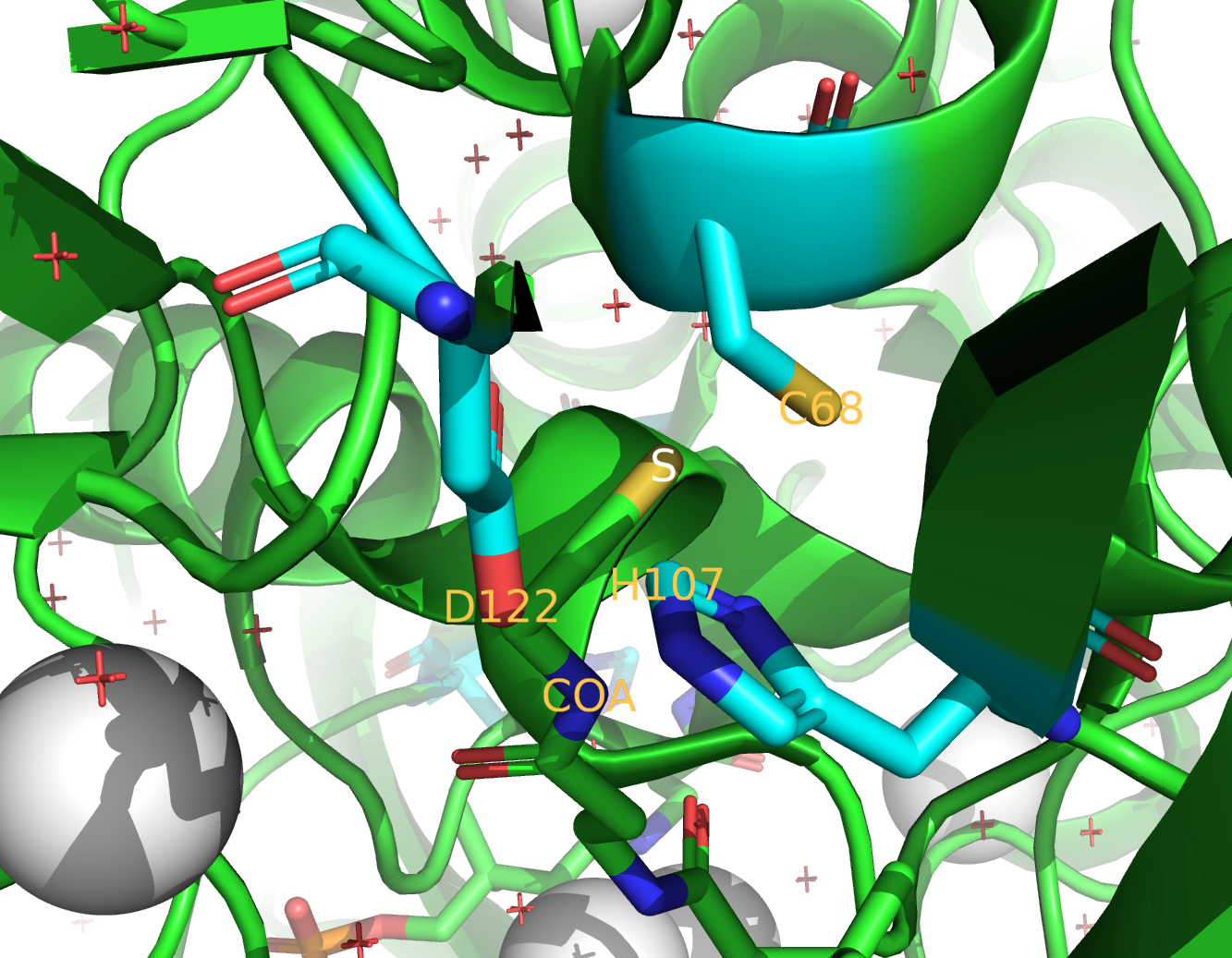
3D depiction of NAT2 active site and catalytic triad.

The two NAT enzymes in humans are NAT1 and NAT2. Mice and rats express three enzymes, NAT1, NAT2, and NAT3. NAT1 and NAT2 have been found to be closely related in species examined thus far, since the two enzymes share 75-95% of their amino acid sequence. Both also have an active site cysteine residue (Cys^{68}) in the N-terminal region. Further, all functional NAT enzymes contain a triad of catalytically essential residues made up of this cysteine, histidine, and asparagine. It has been hypothesized that the catalytic effects of the breast cancer drug Cisplatin are related to Cys^{68}. The inactivation of NAT1 by Cisplatin is caused by an irreversible formation of a Cisplatin adduct with the active-site cysteine residue. The C-terminus helps bind acetyl CoA and differs among NATs including prokaryotic homologues.

NAT1 and NAT2 have different but overlapping substrate specificities. Human NAT1 preferentially acetylates 4-aminobenzoic acid (PABA), 4 amino salicylic acid, sulfamethoxazole, and sulfanilamide. Human NAT2 preferentially acetylates isoniazid (treatment for tuberculosis), hydralazine, procainamide, dapsone, aminoglutethimide, and sulfamethazine.

== Biological significance ==
NAT2 is involved in the metabolism of xenobiotics, which can lead to both the inactivation of drugs and formation of toxic metabolites that can be carcinogenic. The biotransformation of xenobiotics may occur in three phases. In phase I, reactive and polar groups are introduced into the substrates. In phase II, conjugation of xenobiotics with charged species occurs, and in phase III additional modifications are made, with efflux mechanisms leading to excretion by transporters. A genome-wide association study (GWAS) identified human NAT2 as the top signal for insulin resistance, a key marker of diabetes and a major cardiovascular risk factor and has been shown to be associated with whole-body insulin resistance in NAT1 knockout mice. NAT1 is thought to have an endogenous role, likely linked to fundamental cellular metabolism. This may be related to why NAT1 is more widely distributed among tissues than NAT2.

== Importance in humans ==
Each individual metabolizes xenobiotics at different rates, resulting from polymorphisms of the xenobiotic metabolism genes. Both NAT1 and NAT2 are encoded by two highly polymorphic genes located on chromosome 8. NAT2 polymorphisms were one of the first variations to explain this inter-individual variability for drug metabolism. These polymorphisms modify the stability and/ or catalytic activity of enzymes that alter acetylation rates for drugs and xenobiotics, a trait called acetylator phenotype. For NAT2, the acetylator phenotype is described as either slow, intermediate, or rapid. Beyond modifying enzymatic activity, epidemiological studies have found an association of NAT2 polymorphisms with various cancers, likely from varying environmental carcinogens.

Indeed, NAT2 is highly polymorphic in several human populations. Polymorphisms of NAT2 include the single amino acid substitutions R64Q, I114T, D122N, L137F, Q145P, R197Q, and G286E. These are classified as slow acetylators, while the wild-type NAT2 is classified as a fast acetylator. Slow acetylators tend to be associated with drug toxicity and cancer susceptibility. For instance, the NAT2 slow acetylator genotype is associated with an increased risk of bladder cancer, especially among cigarette smokers. Single nucleotide polymorphisms (SNPs) of NAT1 include R64W, V149I, R187Q, M205V, S214A, D251V, E26K, and I263V, and are related to genetic predisposition to cancer, birth defects, and other diseases. The effect of the slow acetylator SNPs in the coding region predominantly act through creating an unstable protein that aggregates intracellularly prior to ubiquitination and degradation.

50% of the British population are deficient in hepatic N-acetyltransferase. This is known as a negative acetylator status. Drugs affected by this are:

- isoniazid
- procainamide
- hydralazine
- dapsone
- sulfasalazine

Adverse events from this deficiency include peripheral neuropathy and hepatoxicity. The slowest acetylator haplotype, NAT2*5B (strongest association with bladder cancer), seems to have been selected for in the last 6,500 years in western and central Eurasian people, suggesting slow acetylation gave an evolutionary advantage to this population, despite the recent unfavorable epidemiological health outcomes data.

== Examples ==
The following is a list of human genes that encode N-acetyltransferase enzymes:

Symbol	Name
AANAT	aralkylamine N-acetyltransferase
ARD1A	ARD1 homolog A, N-acetyltransferase (S. cerevisiae)
GNPNAT1	glucosamine-phosphate N-acetyltransferase 1
HGSNAT	heparan-alpha-glucosaminide N-acetyltransferase
MAK10	MAK10 homolog, amino-acid N-acetyltransferase subunit (S. cerevisiae)
NAT1	N-acetyltransferase 1 (arylamine N-acetyltransferase)
NAT2	N-acetyltransferase 2 (arylamine N-acetyltransferase)
NAT5	N-acetyltransferase 5 (GCN5-related, putative)
NAT6	N-acetyltransferase 6 (GCN5-related)
NAT8	N-acetyltransferase 8 (GCN5-related, putative)
NAT8L	N-acetyltransferase 8-like (GCN5-related, putative)
NAT9	N-acetyltransferase 9 (GCN5-related, putative)
NAT10	N-acetyltransferase 10 (GCN5-related)
NAT11	N-acetyltransferase 11 (GCN5-related, putative)
NAT12	N-acetyltransferase 12 (GCN5-related, putative)
NAT13	N-acetyltransferase 13 (GCN5-related)
NAT14	N-acetyltransferase 14 (GCN5-related, putative)
NAT15	N-acetyltransferase 15 (GCN5-related, putative)
