= MACT =

MACT may refer to:

- Maulana Azad College of Technology, the former name of Maulana Azad National Institute of Technology, Bhopal, an engineering college in Bhopal, India
- Maximum Achievable Control Technology, a kind of standard for emissions reduction promulgated by the United States Environmental Protection Agency
