= C12H9NO2 =

The molecular formula C_{12}H_{9}NO_{2} (molar mass: 199.21 g/mol) may refer to:

- Indophenol
- 4-Nitrobiphenyl
