= Air pollution in Armenia =

Air pollution in Armenia is an environmental and public health issue, which refers to the presence of particulate matter (PM), sulfur dioxide (SO_{2}), nitrogen oxides (NO_{x}), and other pollutants. The sources of pollution include vehicle emissions, industrial operations, construction activities, and road dust. The combination of high temperatures and climate factors contributes to increased air pollution levels, which peak during the summer months. The green spaces provide some reduction of pollution, but their impact remains small.

== Measurement and monitoring ==
=== PM concentrations and sources of emissions ===
Data from the Hydrometeorology and Monitoring Center of Ministry of Environment of Republic of Armenia indicate that concentrations of total particulate matter (PM) in the air often exceeds the maximum allowable concentrations (MAC) in major cities, including Yerevan, Gyumri, and Vanadzor. The annually reported MAC values reach approximately 147 μg/m^{3} in Yerevan, 174 μg/m^{3} in Gyumri, and 154 μg/m^{3} in Vanadzor.

The main sources of air pollution in Yerevan include industry, transportation, and construction, while in Gyumri and Vanadzor, pollution is primarily caused by industrial activities and urban development. Maximum concentrations of heavy metals, such as copper (Cu), lead (Pb), and zinc (Zn), are observed in Yerevan and Gyumri.

According to the 2025 research by ArmStat, about a third of air pollution comes from stationary sources. This includes factories, plants, farms and landfills. Mobile sources cause two-thirds of the air pollution.

About three-fourths of air pollution from stationary sources comes from electricity production plants. Mining and quarrying contribute around 6%, and another 6% come from manufacturing. The remaining 14% come from various economic activities, such as construction and agriculture.

=== National monitoring data ===
Armhydromet 2023 findings show that the average annual levels of dust, SO_{2} and NO_{2} remained below the maximum allowable concentrations (MACs). Cities, such as Yerevan, Gyumri, and Ararat, almost reached the maximum allowable concentrations (MACs) of 0.15 μg/m^{3} for dust, but they did not exceed it. This differs from the 2022, when Gyumri and Vanadzor exceeded the value of MAC, while Yerevan almost reached the bar for the MAC.

By the end of February 2025, the municipality's monitoring system included 166 sensors. Each one of them was collecting data and providing hourly averages for Particulate Matter (PM1, PM2.5, PM10), as well as for air temperature and humidity.

=== Monitoring devices ===
The equipment that monitors air quality dates to the 1970s. This means that the equipment is unable to measure key pollutants and provide accurate monitoring of the air quality. People thus remain uninformed about the situation in their residential areas. Armenia's air quality monitoring network consists of 15 stations. Five of them are located in Yerevan. They measure SO_{2} (sulfur dioxide), CO (carbon monoxide), NO_{2} (nitrogen dioxide), and O_{3} (ozone) and PM (particulate matter), which are the primary components of air quality control. Yerevan has the highest concentration of NO_{2} of 0.110 μg/m^{3}. In the cities of Ararat, Gyumri, Hrazdan, Tsaghkadzor, and Alaverdi, there are a lower concentrations of NO_{2.}

However, the government works on improving the policies on air pollution. It applied major amendments and additions to the 1994 Law on Protection of Atmospheric Air, but numerous laws need to be revised because of the change in standards.

== Health consequences ==
=== Respiratory diseases ===
Respiratory diseases are a major public health issue in Armenia, while industrial and transport air pollution serves as the primary cause. The 2025 study used data from regional monitoring systems. It examined how respiratory disease rates are linked to health and environmental protection expenditures. The research found that pollution levels directly affect the occurrence of respiratory diseases. These findings suggest that Armenia requires stronger environmental regulations to decrease its disease rates.

Air quality has a significant impact on public health. In 2019, PM2.5 pollution caused more than 3,000 deaths in Armenia. Children respond differently to the pollution with heavy metals depending on their physiological, biological and social conditions. Their developing bodies make them more sensitive towards the air quality.

== Methods of reducing air pollution ==
Air pollution can be reduced through multiple methods focusing on prevention, control and mitigation. These methods include policy, regulatory measures and monitoring. Practical approaches, such as recycling, waste minimization and pollution prevention, also help to reduce air pollution.

=== Tree species capturing PM ===
Various tree genera, including Acer, Fraxinus, Pinus, Prunus, Populus, Quercus, Ulmus, Tilia, Platanus, and Betula are the main contributors to particulate matter (PM) capture. This process depends on environmental conditions as seasonal changes, foliar retention, deposition rates, retention efficiency, particle density, and magnetic properties.

The trees species capable of high levels of particulate matter (PM) accumulation are generally tolerant to environmental pollution and capable of maintaining stable accumulation in their leaves. The highest values were recorded in Quercus robur (31.67 μg/cm^{2}) and Platanus orientalis (28.18 μg/cm^{2}) in Yerevan, Aesculus hippocastanum (23.08 μg/cm^{2}) in Vanadzor, and Fraxinus excelsior (22.65 μg/cm^{2}) in Gyumri. These species are characterized by the presence of leaf hairs and relatively large leaf surface areas.

The distribution and extent of such vegetation are reflected in the availability of urban green spaces. Green spaces in almost all cities were reduced due to the economic blockades during the 1990s in the Republic of Armenia. In Yerevan, green areas decreased from 908.3 hectares to 883 hectares, in Gyumri from 528.8 hectares to 297.5 hectares, and in Vanadzor from 191.1 hectares to 136.2 hectares.
