= N4-Acetylcytidine =

Chemical compound

N^{4}-Acetylcytidine

Names
- IUPAC name N-[1-[(2R,3R,4S,5R)-3,4-dihydroxy-5-(hydroxymethyl)oxolan-2-yl]-2-oxopyrimidin-4-yl]acetamide
- Other names: ac4C; N-acetylcytidine

Identifiers
CAS Number	3768-18-1
3D model (JSmol)	Interactive image
ChEBI	CHEBI:70989
ChemSpider	96702
ECHA InfoCard	100.021.087
EC Number	223-195-6
KEGG	C22293
PubChem CID	107461
CompTox Dashboard (EPA)	DTXSID40958718
- InChI: InChI=1S/C11H15N3O6/c1-5(16)12-7-2-3-14(11(19)13-7)10-9(18)8(17)6(4-15)20-10/h2-3,6,8-10,15,17-18H,4H2,1H3,(H,12,13,16,19)/t6-,8-,9-,10-/m1/s1 Key: NIDVTARKFBZMOT-PEBGCTIMSA-N
- SMILES: CC(=O)NC1=NC(=O)N(C=C1)[C@H]2[C@@H]([C@@H]([C@H](O2)CO)O)O

Properties
Chemical formula	C_{11}H_{15}N_{3}O_{6}
Molar mass	285.256 g·mol^{−1}
Appearance	white amorphous solid, sometimes yellow/brown
Density	1.72 g/cm^{3}
- Except where otherwise noted, data are given for materials in their standard state (at 25 °C [77 °F], 100 kPa). Infobox references

N^{4}-Acetylcytidine (ac4C, ac^{4}C) is a post-transcriptional modification found in tRNAs, rRNAs, and mRNAs. In this modification, the amino group at the N^{4} position of the RNA base cytosine is acetylated, resulting in the formation of an amide. In vivo, this modification is considered highly conserved because it is seen in all three domains of life: archaea, bacteria, and eukarya.

== Discovery ==
The first appearances of ac4C in the literature are from 1965 and 1966. These early studies refer to the acetylated nucleoside as N^{6}-acetylcytidine and describe the acetylation as occurring on the exocyclic amino group of cytidine. After the IUPAC established a globalized nucleic acid notation in 1970, the modern designation for the modified nucleotide became N^{4}-acetyl cytidine. In 1965, M. Anteunis and M. Van Montagu report the in-vitro synthesis of N^{6}-acetyl cytidine through the use of thiolacetic acid or α-acetoxyacrylonitrile and the characterization of the structure with proton magnetic resonance (PMR). In 1966, Zachau and coworkers, reported the ellucidated primary structures of two serine tRNAs from yeast and mention the presence of N^{6}-acetyl cytidine at the C12 position.

== In vivo ==
In vivo, the ac4C modification is installed by the enzyme N-acetyltransferase 10 (NAT10), sometimes with assistance from other cofactors such as THUMPD1. Across organisms, homologues of human NAT10 have been observed across archaea, bacteria, and eukarya. In tRNA, rRNA, and mRNA, ac4C modifications are associated with contributions to efficiency of protein translation, as well as increased RNA stability.

=== tRNA ===
The RNA modification ac4C was first identified in tRNA in 1966, when Zachau and coworkers reported ac4C at position 12 of yeast serine tRNA. In 1972, ac4C was reported at the wobble position of the E. coli elongator methionine tRNA. This modification of the wobble base is thought to improve recognition of the AUG codon. In tRNA for leucine and serine, the ac4C modification has been identified at position 12 in Saccharomyces cerevisiae. Johansson and coworkers showed that ac4C contributes to tRNA stability. Deletion of the TAN1 gene, which is required for ac4C formation, resulted in decreased levels of mature serine tRNA.

=== rRNA ===
In 1978, Thomas and coworkers found ac4C on rat 18S rRNA. In 1988, Johansen and coworkers observed ac4C in the 3' end helix of Dictyostelium discoideum 18S rRNA. In 1993, Bruenger and coworkers found ac4C on C. thermophila 5S rRNA. In 2014, Ito and coworkers reported that in HEK293 cells, NAT10 catalyzed the formation of ac4C at position 1842 on 18S rRNA. The acetylated rRNA has been associated with increased stability, particularly under thermal stress.

=== mRNA ===
In mRNA, the ac4C modification is also reported to be catalyzed by NAT10 and its homologues across species. In 2018, Arango and coworkers reported the ac4C modification in mRNA catalyzed by NAT10 in HeLa cells, identified the modification by using mass spectrometry and confirmed it with dot blot analysis. In 2019, Tardu and coworkers quantitatively reported ac4C modifications in Saccharomyces cerevisiae using ultra-high performance liquid chromatography tandem mass spectrometry (UHPLC-MS) methods.

=== Enzymology (NAT10 and homologues) ===
In bacteria, TmcA-type RNA acetyltransferases catalyze the acetylation of the wobble base cytidine of initiator methionine tRNA. An analysis of knockout strains in E. coli indicates that TmcA is nonessential and does not cause growth defects.

In eukaryotes, the RNA acetyltransferases, human Nat10 and yeast Kre33, function alongside adapter proteins to install ac4C in leucine and serine tRNA and in helices 34 and 45 of 18S rRNA. Cellular studies identified the adapter proteins Thumpd1 for Nat10 and Tan1 for Kre33. It was also seen that rRNA acetylation requires an adapter short nucleolar RNA. Ito and coworkers found that Nat10 and Kre33 exclusively modified model RNAs containing a 5'-CCG-3' sequence.

== In vitro ==
=== Synthesis ===
Obtaining the modified nucleoside can be done in vitro, often with a one-pot synthesis. In 1965, M. Anteunis and M. Van Montagu report the in-vitro synthesis of N^{6}-acetyl cytidine through the use of thiolacetic acid or α-acetoxyacrylonitrile and the characterization of the structure with proton magnetic resonance (PMR). In 1968, Montagu and coworkers also report success in obtaining the acetylated nucleoside using thioacetic acid. However, they go on to say that with the nucleotide diphosphate or triphosphates, using thioacetic acid resulted in many side reactions. In 1989, Bhat and coworkers reported success acetylating the nucleoside by dissolving it in dimethylformamide (DMF) and adding acetic anhydride as the acetylating agent.
