= N-acetyltransferase 8 =

Enzyme found in humans

NAT8

Identifiers
- Aliases: NAT8, ATase2, CML1, GLA, Hcml1, TSC501, TSC510, CCNAT, N-acetyltransferase 8 (putative)
- External IDs: OMIM: 606716; MGI: 1915646; GeneCards: NAT8
Enzyme activity
EC #	BRENDA	ExPASy	KEGG	MetaCyc
2.3.1.80	↗	↗	↗	↗

Gene location (Human)
Chr.	Chromosome 2 (human)
Band	2p13.1	Start	73,640,723 bp
Band	2p13.1	End	73,642,422 bp

Gene location (Mouse)
Chr.	Chromosome 6 (mouse)
Band	6|6 C3	Start	85,807,370 bp
Band	6|6 C3	End	85,809,064 bp
RNA expression pattern
Bgee	Human / Mouse (ortholog); Top expressed in: glomerulus; metanephric glomerulus; kidney tubule; renal medulla; right lobe of liver; human kidney; gonad; testicle; caput epididymis; mucosa of ileum / Top expressed in: right kidney; human kidney; left lobe of liver; proximal tubule; duodenum; jejunum; epithelium of small intestine; ileum; intestinal villus; yolk sac; More reference expression data
BioGPS	n/a
Gene ontology
Molecular function	transferase activity; cysteine-S-conjugate N-acetyltransferase activity; acyltransferase activity; protein binding; lysine N-acetyltransferase activity, acting on acetyl phosphate as donor
Cellular component	integral component of membrane; endoplasmic reticulum-Golgi intermediate compartment membrane; endoplasmic reticulum membrane; membrane; endoplasmic reticulum-Golgi intermediate compartment; endoplasmic reticulum
Biological process	peptidyl-lysine N6-acetylation; positive regulation of gene expression; negative regulation of apoptotic process; amyloid-beta metabolic process; glutathione metabolic process
Sources:Amigo / QuickGO
Orthologs
Databases	NCBI: entry; OMA: entry
Species	Human	Mouse
Entrez	9027	68396
Ensembl	ENSG00000144035	ENSMUSG00000030004
UniProt	Q9UHE5	Q9JIY7
RefSeq (mRNA)	NM_003960	NM_023455; NM_001362060
RefSeq (protein)	NP_003951	NP_075944; NP_001348989
Location (UCSC)	Chr 2: 73.64 – 73.64 Mb	Chr 6: 85.81 – 85.81 Mb
PubMed search
- Wikidata
View/Edit Human	View/Edit Mouse

N-acetyltransferase 8 is an enzyme that in humans is encoded by the NAT8 gene. This enzyme is located in the membrane of the endoplasmic reticulum where it catalyzes the acetylation of lysine residues of proteins, such as PROM1 and BACE1.

== Clinical relevance ==
Mutations in the NAT8 gene have been associated with a greater frequency of chronic kidney disease in genome-wide association studies (GWAS).

== See also ==
- N-acetyltransferase
