= RNA cytidine acetyltransferase =

Enzyme found in humans

NAT10

Identifiers
- Aliases: NAT10, ALP, NET43, N-acetyltransferase 10, Kre33
- External IDs: OMIM: 609221; MGI: 2138939; GeneCards: NAT10

Gene location (Human)
Chr.	Chromosome 11 (human)
Band	11p13	Start	34,105,617 bp
Band	11p13	End	34,147,670 bp

Gene location (Mouse)
Chr.	Chromosome 2 (mouse)
Band	2|2 E2	Start	103,551,601 bp
Band	2|2 E2	End	103,591,615 bp
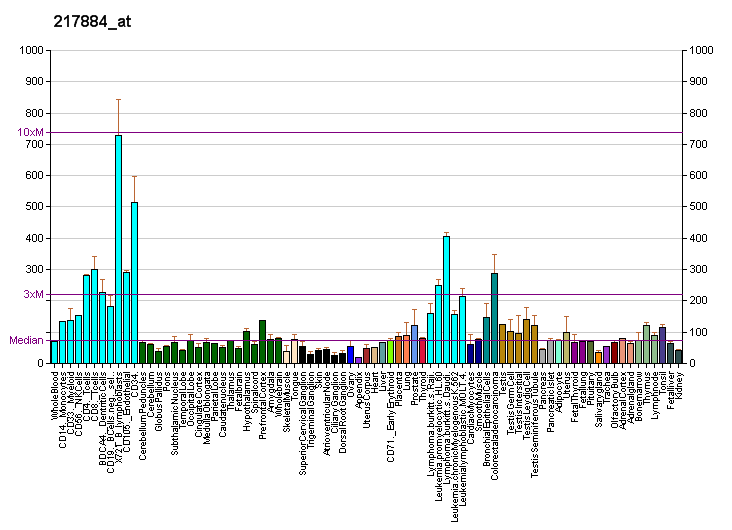
RNA expression pattern
Bgee	Human / Mouse (ortholog); Top expressed in: sural nerve; skin of leg; skin of abdomen; ventricular zone; right ovary; left ovary; Achilles tendon; body of pancreas; tonsil; right uterine tube / Top expressed in: spermatocyte; epiblast; neural layer of retina; yolk sac; primitive streak; spermatid; tail of embryo; Paneth cell; lens; ventricular zone; More reference expression data
BioGPS	More reference expression data
Gene ontology
Molecular function	transferase activity; nucleotide binding; acyltransferase activity; protein binding; ATP binding; N-acetyltransferase activity; tRNA binding; tRNA N-acetyltransferase activity; rRNA cytidine N-acetyltransferase activity; RNA binding; DNA polymerase binding
Cellular component	nucleolus; membrane; nucleus; telomerase holoenzyme complex; nucleoplasm; midbody; 90S preribosome
Biological process	rRNA processing; negative regulation of telomere maintenance via telomerase; tRNA processing; ncRNA processing; rRNA metabolic process; rRNA modification; tRNA wobble cytosine modification; tRNA acetylation; rRNA acetylation involved in maturation of SSU-rRNA; ribosomal small subunit biogenesis
Sources:Amigo / QuickGO
Orthologs
Databases	NCBI: entry; OMA: entry
Species	Human	Mouse
Entrez	55226	98956
Ensembl	ENSG00000135372	ENSMUSG00000027185
UniProt	Q9H0A0	Q8K224
RefSeq (mRNA)	NM_001144030; NM_024662	NM_153126
RefSeq (protein)	NP_001137502; NP_078938	NP_694766
Location (UCSC)	Chr 11: 34.11 – 34.15 Mb	Chr 2: 103.55 – 103.59 Mb
PubMed search
- Wikidata
View/Edit Human	View/Edit Mouse

RNA cytidine acetyltransferase, also called N-acetyltransferase 10, is an enzyme that in humans is encoded by the NAT10 gene. This enzyme functions to make N4-Acetylcytidine modifications to multiple types of RNA, including mRNAs, 18S rRNA, and tRNAs. While it has shown some protein lysine N-acetyltransferase activity in vitro, that doesn't seem to be its primary function in the body.
