= N-acetyltransferase 9 =

Enzyme found in humans

NAT9

Identifiers
- Aliases: NAT9, EBSP, hNATL, N-acetyltransferase 9 (putative)
- External IDs: OMIM: 620913; MGI: 1913426; GeneCards: NAT9
Enzyme activity
EC #	BRENDA	ExPASy	KEGG	MetaCyc
2.3.1.308	↗	↗	↗	↗

Gene location (Human)
Chr.	Chromosome 17 (human)
Band	17q25.1	Start	74,770,529 bp
Band	17q25.1	End	74,776,367 bp

Gene location (Mouse)
Chr.	Chromosome 11 (mouse)
Band	11|11 E2	Start	115,182,832 bp
Band	11|11 E2	End	115,187,859 bp
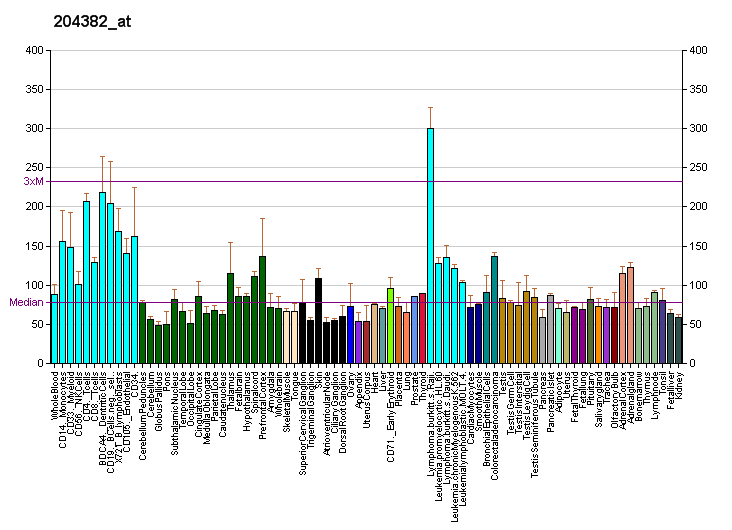
RNA expression pattern
Bgee	Human / Mouse (ortholog); Top expressed in: anterior pituitary; right adrenal gland; left adrenal cortex; right adrenal cortex; right ovary; left ovary; right hemisphere of cerebellum; right lobe of thyroid gland; left lobe of thyroid gland; canal of the cervix / Top expressed in: spermatocyte; seminiferous tubule; granulocyte; spermatid; neural layer of retina; right kidney; muscle of thigh; yolk sac; proximal tubule; left lobe of liver; More reference expression data
BioGPS	More reference expression data
Gene ontology
Molecular function	transferase activity; acyltransferase activity; protein binding; acyltransferase activity, transferring groups other than amino-acyl groups; N-acetyltransferase activity
Cellular component	protein-containing complex
Biological process	N-terminal protein amino acid acetylation; protein acetylation
Sources:Amigo / QuickGO
Orthologs
Databases	NCBI: entry; OMA: entry
Species	Human	Mouse
Entrez	26151	66176
Ensembl	ENSG00000109065	ENSMUSG00000015542
UniProt	Q9BTE0	Q3UG98
RefSeq (mRNA)	NM_001305077; NM_001305078; NM_001305079; NM_001305080; NM_001305081 NM_001305082; NM_001305083; NM_001305084; NM_001305085; NM_001305086; NM_001305087; NM_001305088; NM_015654	NM_025400
RefSeq (protein)	NP_001292006; NP_001292007; NP_001292008; NP_001292009; NP_001292010 NP_001292011; NP_001292012; NP_001292013; NP_001292014; NP_001292015; NP_001292016; NP_001292017; NP_056469	NP_079676; NP_001349818; NP_001349819; NP_001349820; NP_001349821
Location (UCSC)	Chr 17: 74.77 – 74.78 Mb	Chr 11: 115.18 – 115.19 Mb
PubMed search
- Wikidata
View/Edit Human	View/Edit Mouse

Alpha/beta-tubulin-N-acetyltransferase 9, also called N-acetyltransferase 9 (NAT9), is an enzyme that in humans is encoded by the NAT9 gene. The enzyme functions to acetylate the proteins alpha- and beta-tubulin at N-terminal residues. In particular, it catalyzes the following reaction (EC 2.3.1.308):

N-terminal L-methionyl-[tubulin] + acetyl-CoA = N-terminal N(alpha)-acetyl-L-methionyl-[tubulin] + CoA + H^{+}
