= Mobile source air pollution =

Air pollution emitted by motor vehicles, airplanes, locomotives, and other engines

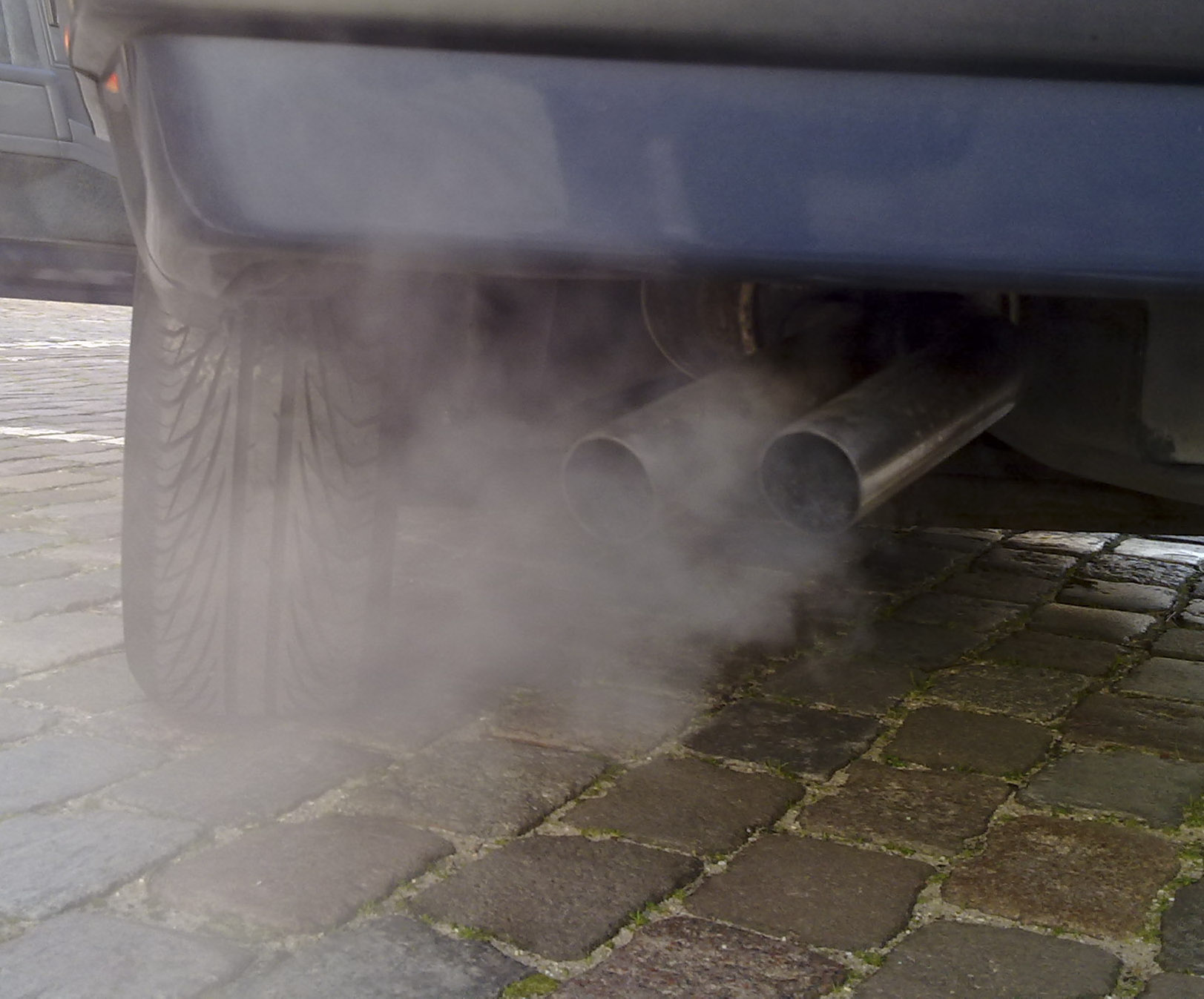
Cars are major sources of mobile air pollution.

Mobile source air pollution includes any air pollution emitted by motor vehicles, airplanes, locomotives, and other engines and equipment that can be moved from one location to another. Many of these pollutants contribute to environmental degradation and have negative effects on human health. To prevent unnecessary damage to human health and the environment, environmental regulatory agencies such as the U.S. Environmental Protection Agency have established policies to minimize air pollution from mobile sources. Similar agencies exist at the state level. Due to the large number of mobile sources of air pollution, and their ability to move from one location to another, mobile sources are regulated differently from stationary sources, such as power plants. Instead of monitoring individual emitters, such as an individual vehicle, mobile sources are often regulated more broadly through design and fuel standards. Examples of this include corporate average fuel economy standards and laws that ban leaded gasoline in the United States. The increase in the number of motor vehicles driven in the U.S. has made efforts to limit mobile source pollution challenging. As a result, there have been a number of different regulatory instruments implemented to reach the desired emissions goals.

== Broad classification ==
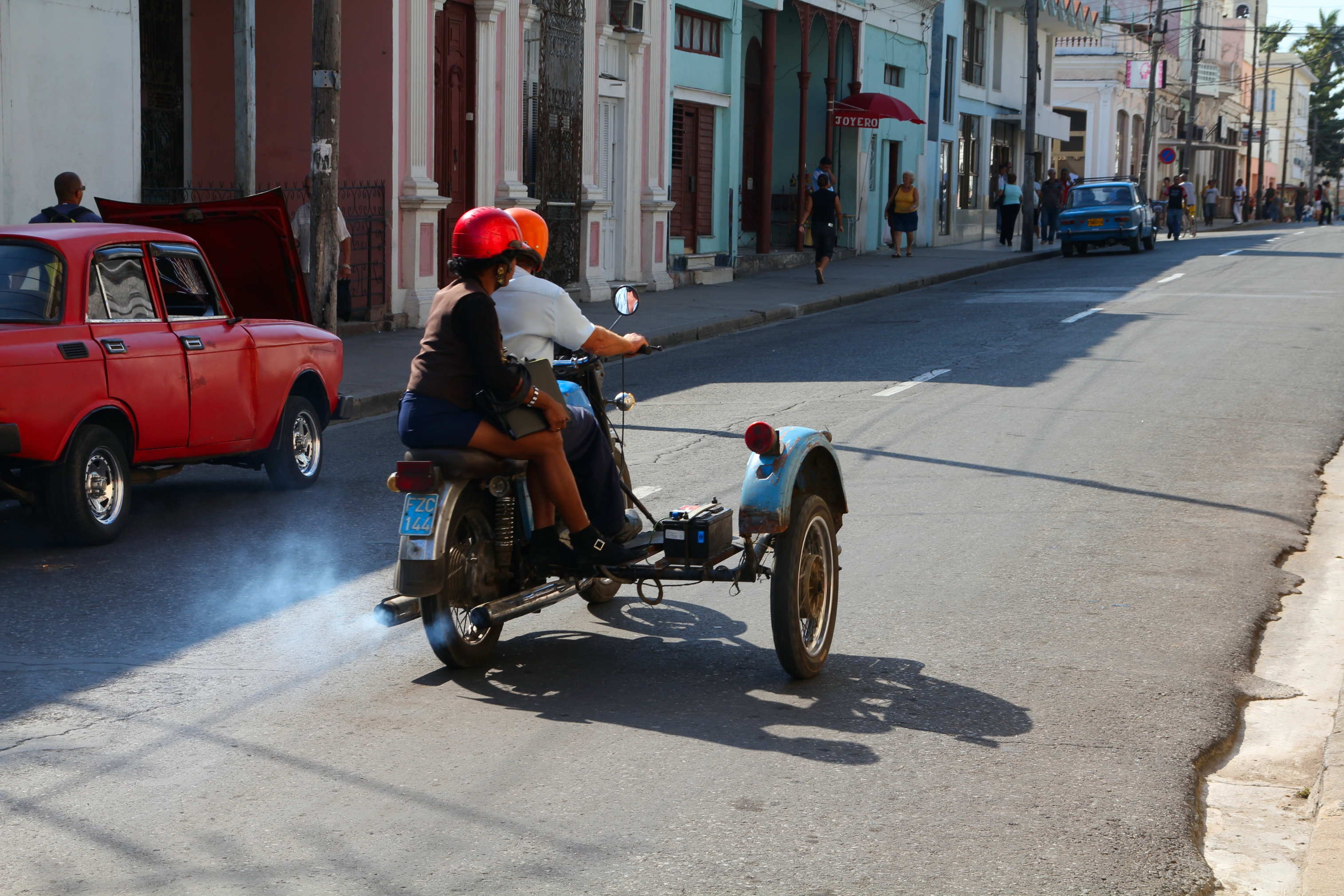
Old motorcycle emitting visible fumes

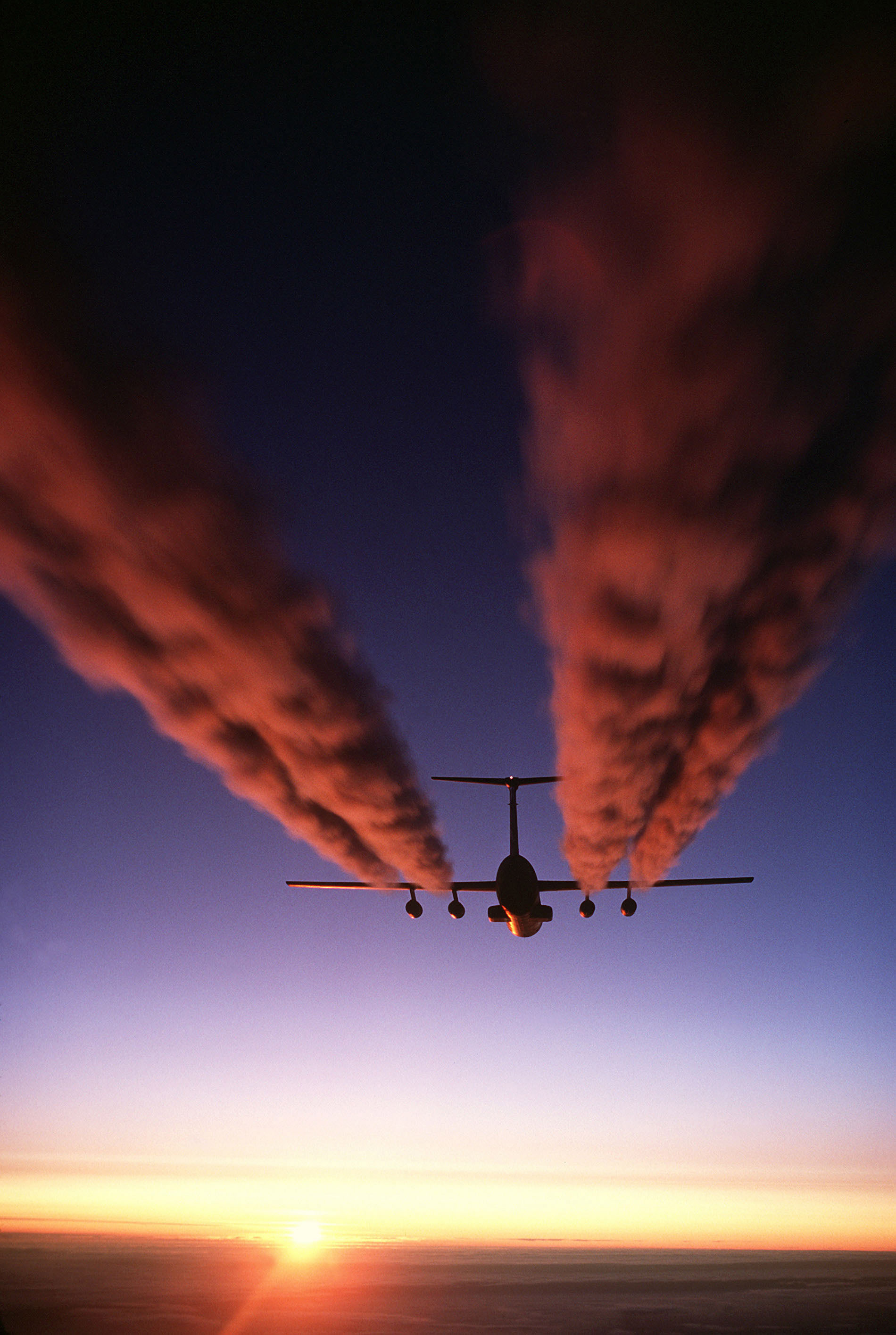
Airplanes produce significant levels of pollution emissions.

There are a number of different mobile sources of air pollution, some contributing more to pollution than others. As mentioned previously, mobile sources are regulated differently from stationary sources due to the large number of sources and their ability to move from one location to another. Different mobile sources operate differently and generate different emission types and levels. The E.P.A. differentiates between mobile sources by classifying them as either on-road vehicles or non-road vehicles. On-road vehicles and non-road vehicles are often subject to different regulations.

=== Road sources ===
- Cars
- Light Duty and Heavy Duty Trucks
- Buses
- Motorbikes

=== Non-road sources ===
- Aircraft
- Motorboats (Diesel and Gasoline)
- Diesel locomotives
- Diesel multiple units
- Construction Equipment

== Major regulated mobile source pollutants ==
There are a number of different pollutants that are emitted by mobile sources. Some make up a large portion of the total air concentration for that particular pollutant while others do not make up as much of the total air concentration.

- Carbon Monoxide: Carbon monoxide forms when carbon in fuel does not burn completely (incomplete combustion). The main source of carbon monoxide in air is vehicle emissions. As much as 95 percent of the carbon monoxide in typical U.S. cities comes from mobile sources, according to EPA studies. Carbon monoxide is harmful because it reduces oxygen delivery to the body's organs and tissues. It is most harmful to those who suffer from heart and respiratory disease.
- Carbon Dioxide: Carbon dioxide is one of the most prominent greenhouse gasses emitted by motor vehicles. In 2006, 23.6% of the total inventory of U.S. greenhouse gasses were derived from motor vehicles. The compound is generated as a byproduct of the combustion of any fuel source containing carbon.
- Nitrogen Oxides: Nitrogen oxides form when fuel burns at high temperatures, such as in motor vehicle engines. Mobile sources are responsible for more than half of all nitrogen oxide emissions in the United States. Both on-road and non-road mobile sources are major nitrogen oxide polluters. These problems include ozone and smog.
- Hydrocarbons: Hydrocarbons are a precursor to ground-level ozone, a serious air pollutant in cities across the United States. A key component of smog, ground-level ozone is formed by reactions involving hydrocarbons and nitrogen oxides in the presence of sunlight. Hydrocarbon emissions result from incomplete fuel combustion and from fuel evaporation. Ground-level ozone causes health problems such as difficulty breathing, lung damage, and reduced cardiovascular functioning.
- Particulate Matter: Atmospheric particulate matter or airborne particulate matter is the term for solid or liquid particles found in the air. Some particles are large or dark enough to be seen as soot or smoke, but fine particulate matter is tiny and is generally not visible to the naked eye. Fine particulate matter is a health concern because very fine particles can reach the deepest regions of the lungs. Health effects include asthma, difficult or painful breathing, and chronic bronchitis, especially in children and the elderly.
- Air Toxics: The EPA lists over 1100 individual compounds which are classified as air toxics. These compounds are emitted by mobile sources, mostly due to the chemical nature of the fuel source. These compounds are known or expected to cause serious physical damages including cancer, reproductive, and developmental side effects.

== Laws and regulatory standards ==
Regulatory law	Year of establishment	Description
Air Pollution Control Act	1955	First federal air pollution legislation; Funded research for scope and sources of air pollution
Clean Air Act	1963	Authorized the development of a national program to address air pollution related environmental problems; Authorized research into techniques to minimize air pollution
Motor Vehicle Air Pollution Control Act	1965	The first federal legislation designed to control emissions from automobiles; Authorized the Department of Health, Education, and Welfare (subsequently separated into the Department of Education and the Department of Health and Human Services in 1979) to establish the first federally mandated light duty vehicle emission standards; The act required a 72% reduction in hydrocarbon emissions, a 56% reduction in carbon monoxide emissions, and a complete elimination of crankcase hydrocarbon emissions for all light duty vehicles produced after 1968, using a 1963 base year.
Air Quality Act	1967	Authorized enforcement procedures for air pollution problems involving interstate transport of pollutants; Authorized expanded research activities
Clean Air Act Extension	1970	Authorized the establishment of National Ambient Air Quality Standards; Established requirements for State Implementation Plans to achieve the National Ambient Air Quality Standards; Authorized the establishment of New Source Performance Standards for new and modified stationary sources; Authorized the establishment of National Emissions Standards for Hazardous Air Pollutants; Increased enforcement authority; Authorized requirements for control of motor vehicle emissions
Clean Air Act Amendments	1977	Authorized provisions related to the Prevention of Significant Deterioration; Authorized provisions relating to areas which are non-attainment with respect to the National Ambient Air Quality Standards
Clean Air Act Amendments	1990	Authorized programs for Acid Deposition Control; Authorized a program to control 189 toxic pollutants, including those previously regulated by the National Emissions Standards for Hazardous Air Pollutants; Established permit program requirements; Expanded and modified provisions concerning the attainment of National Ambient Air Quality Standards; Expanded and modified enforcement authority; Established a program to phase out the use of chemicals that deplete the ozone layer.

== U.S. enforcement agencies ==
=== Federal agencies ===
- Environmental Protection Agency: The Environmental Protection Agency's Office of Air and Radiation (OAR) develops national programs, policies, and regulations for controlling air pollution and radiation exposure. OAR is concerned with pollution prevention and energy efficiency, indoor and outdoor air quality, industrial air pollution, pollution from vehicles and engines, radon, acid rain, stratospheric ozone depletion, climate change, and radiation protection.
- Department of Energy: The Department of Energy's clean air compliance activities are overseen by its Office of Health, Safety, and Security.
- Department of Transportation

- Federal Aviation Administration: Practically all aviation emission sources are independently regulated through equipment specific regulations, standards and recommended practices, and operational guidelines, which are established by a variety of organizations. For example, on-road vehicles, which take passengers to and from the airport, meet stringent Federal tailpipe standards set by EPA. Stationary sources on the airport, like power boilers and refrigeration chillers, must meet independent state regulations. And FAA certification is required for essentially all aviation equipment and processes. For example there are more than 60 standards that apply to aircraft engine design, materials of construction, durability, instrumentation and control, and safety, among others. These are in addition to the Fuel Venting and Exhaust Emission Requirements for Turbine Engine Powered Airplanes (FAR Part 34), which guide compliance with EPA’s aircraft exhaust emission standards. The International Civil Aviation Organization (ICAO) is a United Nations intergovernmental body responsible for worldwide planning, implementation, and coordination of civil aviation. ICAO sets emission standards for jet engines. These are the basis of FAA’s aircraft engine performance certification standards, established through EPA regulations.

- Federal Highway Administration: The FHWA, EPA, the Health Effects Institute, and others have funded and conducted research studies to try to more clearly define potential risks from mobile source air toxics emissions associated with highway projects. The FHWA policies and procedures for implementing NEPA is prescribed by regulation in 23 CFR § 771.

- National Highway Traffic Safety Administration: NHTSA administers the CAFE program, and the Environmental Protection Agency (EPA) provides the fuel economy data. NHTSA sets fuel economy standards for cars and light trucks sold in the U.S. while EPA calculates the average fuel economy for each manufacturer.

=== State-level agencies ===
EPA has ten regional offices, each of which is responsible for the execution of programs within several states and territories. California is the only state which has its own regulatory agency, the California Air Resources Board (CARB). The other states are allowed to follow CARB or federal regulations.

== Enforcement mechanisms and policy instruments ==
Federal, state, and local governments utilize a wide range of policy instruments to control pollution from mobile sources. On the federal level, many different agencies are responsible for regulating, or at least creating policies to limit, pollution from mobile sources. This is necessary given the broad range of objects that are considered “mobile sources,” from aircraft and off-road vehicles, to locomotives and on-road vehicles. The Federal Aviation Administration, for example, establishes standards to limit emissions from aircraft, whereas the U.S. Department of Transportation and Environmental Protection Agency administer various aspects of on-road vehicle fuel economy regulations. On the state level, mandatory vehicle emissions-testing programs are often required as part of the annual motor-vehicle registration process.

=== Labeling policies ===
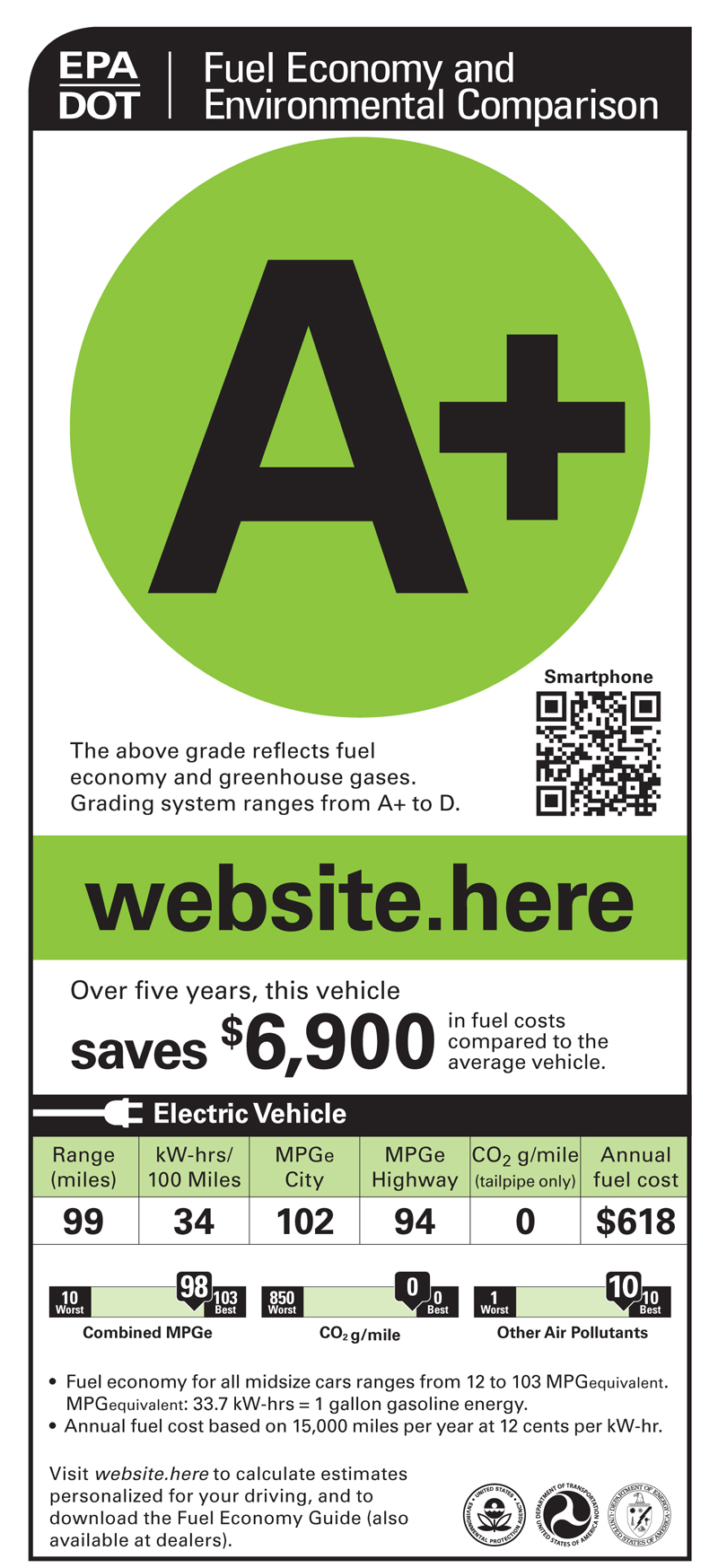
Proposed CAFE label (model year 2012 and later)

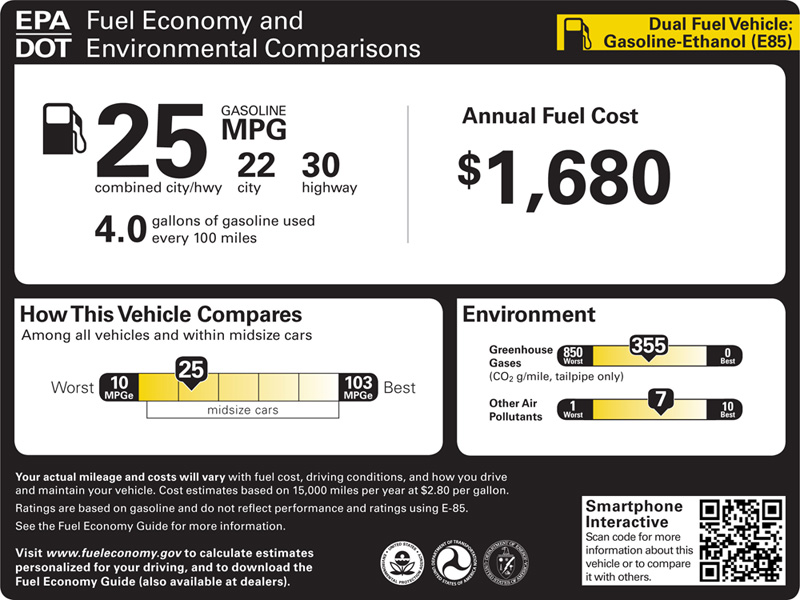
Proposed CAFE label (model year 2012 and later)

Many governments throughout the world require manufacturers of particular products to attach information-related labels to their products. Common examples in the United States include food nutrition and ingredient labels for food products, Surgeon General labels on alcohol and tobacco products, and labels for common household pesticides. Like mobile sources of air pollution, there is a broad range of products that may require government labeling regulation, therefore numerous federal agencies oversee various label-related regulation programs. For example, the US Food and Drug Administration oversees food nutrition and ingredient label regulations, whereas the US Environmental Protection Agency sets specific standards for the labeling of pesticides.

The primary goal of labeling regulations is to provide consumers and other product users with important information about the product. Essentially, labeling policies are designed to correct the market failure of imperfect information. For consumers to make the best decisions when allocating scarce resources, such as income, detailed information about particular products may be required. In this sense, labels also help correct information asymmetries that often exist within many market transactions.

In the United States, all new cars and light-duty trucks are required to have labels that display specific fuel economy information. The US Environmental Protection Agency calculates the average fuel economy for each vehicle manufacturer, and provides the data to the National Highway Traffic Safety Administration (NHTSA), which administers and enforces the Corporate Average Fuel Economy (CAFE) program. The purpose of the program is (1) to reduce emissions by requiring vehicle manufacturers to meet minimum fuel economy levels, and (2) to provide consumers with fuel economy information before purchasing new vehicles.

EPA and NHTSA are redesigning the labels to provide even more information to consumers. The new labels will, for the first time, provide information about each vehicle's greenhouse gas emissions, as required by the Energy Independence and Security Act of 2007. The agencies are proposing two different label designs and are seeking public comments about which labels will be most helpful to consumers. Consumers can submit comments about the two proposed label styles on EPA's website here and here.

=== Taxes ===
Another common policy instrument used by governments to influence market behavior is taxation. In the case of mobile source air pollution, the United States government has established many different taxes to limit emissions from various mobile sources. Perhaps one of the most well known is the gas guzzler tax, established by the Energy Tax Act of 1978. The act set minimum fuel economy standards for all new cars sold in the United States.

The tax is levied against manufacturers of new cars that fail to meet the minimum fuel economy level of 22.5 miles per gallon. The tax does not apply to minivans, sport utility vehicles, or pick-up trucks, as these made up a small portion of the US fleet when the tax was established in 1978. Manufacturers pay a level of tax based upon the average fuel economy for each particular vehicle produced, ranging from $1,000 for vehicles achieving at least 21.5 but less than 22.5 MPG, to $7,000 for each vehicle achieving less than 12.5 MPG. Vehicles that achieve a minimum average fuel economy of 22.5 MPG are not subject to the gas guzzler tax.

=== Tax credits ===
Governments may also offer tax credits to encourage certain types of behavior within market economies. For example, if a government wants to encourage consumers to purchase more fuel-efficient vehicles, the government could offer tax credits to effectively lower the price of each vehicle. The logic of this approach is consistent with the laws of supply and demand, namely, that as the price of a good decreases, the quantity demanded of that good will increase. This is true given that other important factors, such as current levels of supply and demand, remain constant.

The US federal government currently utilizes numerous tax credits to reduce emissions from mobile sources. One of the more common tax credits is the "Qualified Plug-In Electric Drive Motor Vehicle Tax Credit." This credit is available "for the purchase of a new qualified plug-in electric drive motor vehicle that draws propulsion using a traction battery that has at least four kilowatt hours of capacity, uses an external source of energy to recharge the battery, has a gross vehicle weight rating of up to 14,000 pounds, and meets specified emission standards." The credit ranges from $2,500 to $7,000, depending upon the vehicle's weight rating. Consumers who purchase the new Chevrolet Volt are eligible for the full $7,500 credit. Another tax credit targeted at consumers is the "Fuel Cell Motor Vehicle Tax Credit," which was originally set at $8,000 for the purchase of qualified light-duty fuel cell vehicles. On December 31, 2009, the tax credit was reduced to $4,000.

Tax credits to limit mobile source pollution can also be targeted at producers of particular products. For example, "Advanced Biofuel Production Payments" are available to "eligible producers of advanced biofuels," or for fuels derived from "renewable biomass other than corn kernel starch." Such producers "may receive payments to support expanded production of advanced biofuels," dependent upon the "quantity and duration of production by the eligible producer; the net nonrenewable energy content of the advanced biofuel, if sufficient data is available; the number of producers participating in the program; and the amount of funds available." While many critics have argued that biofuels can actually increase greenhouse gas emissions, research from the US Department of Energy indicates that biofuels "burn cleaner than gasoline, resulting in fewer greenhouse gas emissions, and are fully biodegradable, unlike some fuel additives."

=== Voluntary programs ===
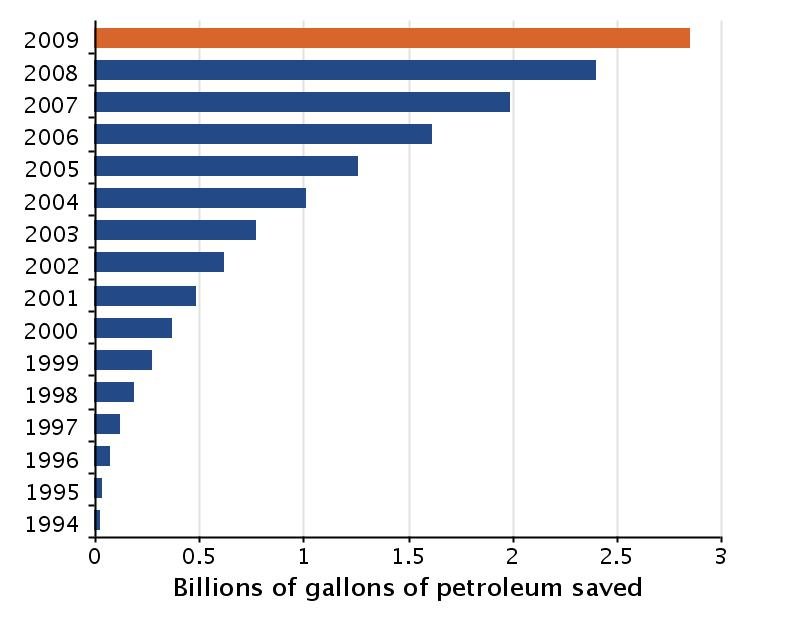
The US Department of Energy's "Clean Cities" program has saved more than 3 billion US gallons (11,000,000 m^{3}) of petroleum since its inception in 1993.

Other important policy instruments that can be utilized by governments are voluntary programs. These programs bring together various stakeholders with the goal of achieving some particular policy outcome. The Department of Energy, for example, created the "Clean Cities" program to reduce petroleum use in the transportation sector. The Clean Cities program partners with more than 80 volunteer organizations throughout the United States, developing public-private partnerships that promote alternative fuels and advanced vehicles, fuel blends, fuel economy, hybrid vehicles, and idle reduction. The three primary goals of the program are

1. Replacement: Replace petroleum used in the transportation sector with alternative and renewable fuels,
2. Reduction: Reduce petroleum use by promoting smarter driving practices, idle reduction, fuel-efficient vehicles, and advanced technologies, and
3. Elimination: Eliminating petroleum use by encouraging greater use of mass transit systems, trip-elimination measures, and congestion mitigation.

The program was initiated in 1993 and has saved nearly 3 billion US gallons (11,000,000 m^{3}) of petroleum since its inception.

Another example of a voluntary program is the Environmental Protection Agency's "SmartWay Transport Partnership". This voluntary partnership between the EPA and the ground freight industry is designed to reduce greenhouse gases and air pollution through increased fuel efficiency programs. EPA provides partners with "benefits and services that include fleet management tools, technical support, information, public recognition, and use of the SmartWay Transport Partner logo."

"Clean Construction USA" is an additional voluntary program administered by EPA that promotes the reduction of diesel exhaust emissions from construction equipment and other construction vehicles. The program encourages proper operations and maintenance, the use of emission-reducing technologies, and the use of cleaner fuels.

=== Subsidies ===
Subsidies are another powerful policy tool used by governments to influence economic behavior. Subsidies can take many forms, ranging from tax credits to direct cash payments. To limit mobile source pollution from airports, for example, the Federal Aviation Administration's "Voluntary Airport Low Emission Program" provides funding to U.S. commercial service airports located in air quality non attainment and maintenance areas. While the funding can be used to reduce emissions from both mobile and stationary sources at the airport, much of the program's emphasis is on mobile source emission reduction. The program promotes the use of electric ground support equipment, such as electric bag tugs that take luggage from the airplane to the baggage claim. Other airport equipment that can be electronically operated include various types of belt loaders, along with the pushback tractors that assist airplanes when departing from the gate.

Another important goal of the program is to install underground fuel hydrants at airports. These would eliminate the need for fuel trucks, an important source of mobile emissions. The Voluntary Airport Low Emission Program was established under the Vision 100 Century of Aviation Reauthorization Act of 2003.

=== Command and control: performance standards ===
Numerous states have emissions-testing programs to limit pollution from on-road vehicles, such as cars and light-duty trucks. Each of these vehicles must meet specific emissions targets before being allowed to obtain or renew vehicle registrations. Many of these programs are administered on the local and county level. For example, the Clean Air Car Check is a vehicle emissions-testing program for all vehicles registered in Lake and Porter counties in Indiana. The two counties were designated as non-attainment areas for ozone levels in 1977 by the Environmental Protection Agency. By 1990, the two counties were reclassified as severe non-attainment areas, a designation which requires states to create State Implementation Plans to attain and maintain certain air pollution standards. Although the counties were again reclassified in 2010, this time as attainment areas, the two counties will maintain their vehicle inspection and maintenance program because it is a "key piece of Indiana's plan to prevent backsliding so that the area can remain in attainment."

==== Corporate Average Fuel Efficiency standard ====
According to the Corporate Average Fuel Economy standard (CAFE) regulation, which was enacted in 1975, every seller of automobiles in the US had to achieve by 1985 a minimum sales-weighted average fuel efficiency of 27.5 miles per gallon (MPG). This standard had to be achieved for domestically produced and imported cars separately. Failure to meet the prescribed standard incurred a penalty of $5 per car per 1/10 of a gallon that the corporate average fuel economy fell below the standard. The first idea about the environmental impact of the CAFE regulation can be obtained by examining its effects on the average fuel efficiency of domestic and foreign firms; these effects are largest for the domestic production of US manufacturers, whose corporate average fuel efficiency would be lower by 1.2 MPG in the absence of CAFE standards. CAFE standards also lead to approximately 19 million US gallons (72,000 m^{3}) fuel consumption savings per year. Contrary to the CAFE standards, gasoline taxes affect not only new but also used cars, so that there is no reason to expect any substitution towards less fuel efficient used cars when taxes are raised. Small tax increases are insufficient to induce fuel cost savings of the same order of magnitude as CAFE.

=== Marketable allowances ===
==== Leaded gasoline ====
Lead was originally added to fuel as an additive to prevent engine knocking. In the 1970s, virtually all gasoline used in the United States contained lead with an average concentration of almost 2.4 grams per gallon. By the mid 1970s, the EPA began formulating plans to phase lead out of fuel for two main reasons. There was growing concern over lead's potential effects on human health, especially with respected hypertension and cognitive development in children. Additionally, the introduction of the catalytic converter in new automobiles manufactured after 1975 required an adjustment to the fuel standards. Catalytic converters were utilized in new automobiles to help meet the hydrocarbon, carbon monoxide, and nitrogen oxide emission standards mandated by the 1970 Clean Air Act. Unfortunately, the catalytic converters could only function properly with unleaded fuel.

In order to protect human health and ensure that catalytic converters were operating properly, the EPA required that the average lead content of all gasoline sold be reduced from 1.7 grams per gallon after January 1, 1975 to 0.5 grams per gallon by January 1, 1979. Eventually, the EPA lowered the average lead concentration standard goal to 0.1 gm/gal by January 1, 1986. The EPA defined "averages" in a way that allowed refiners who owned more than one refinery to average or "trade" among refineries to satisfy their lead limits each quarter. Taking note of the trading that was taking place, the EPA permitted refiners to bank credits for use until the end of 1987. EPA enforcement relied on reporting requirements and random testing of gasoline samples.

The EPA has officially concluded its effort to phase out lead in fuel. As of 1996, manufacturers are no longer required to place "unleaded fuel only" labels on the dashboard and on or around the fuel filler inlet area of each new motor vehicle. Additionally, several record keeping and reporting requirements for gasoline refiners and importers have been lifted. Critics have viewed the lead credit trading program as a successful implementation of a cap and trade system allowing for the gradual reduction of a pollutant. Lead credit trading as a percentage of lead use rose above 40 percent by 1987. An estimated 20 percent of refineries participated in trading early in the program, eventually rising to 60 percent of refineries.

==== Benzene in gasoline ====
In 2007, the Mobile Source Air Toxics Rule was created to help limit the hazardous emissions generated as a result of fuel combustion in mobile sources. Benzene is one particular component of gasoline that is known to pose a hazard to human health. In 2007, benzene concentrations in gasoline averaged 1% by volume. The EPA mandated refiners and importers to begin producing gasoline with annual an average benzene content no greater than 0.62% beginning in 2011. The EPA has listed certain technologies that can be utilized in order to achieve the new standards, but refiners can petition the EPA to approve additional technologies.

Refiners and importers could earn credits by reducing benzene levels below 0.62% before 2011. These credits could be auctioned to other companies, essentially creating a marketable allowance approach for reducing benzene content in gasoline. The nationwide banking and trading system does nave some limitations. No individual refiner or importer could produce gasoline with benzene concentrations exceeding 1.3% by volume, even with credits.

== See also ==
- Air pollution
- Emissions standard
- Emissions trading
- List of most-polluted cities by particulate matter concentration
- Motor vehicle emissions
  - Low emission zone
