= 4,4'-Methylenebis(2-chloroaniline) =

4,4′-Methylenebis(2-chloroaniline)
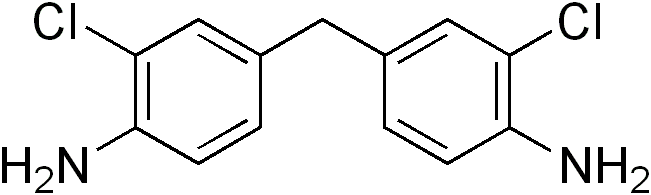

Names
- Preferred IUPAC name 4,4′-Methylenebis(2-chloroaniline)
- Other names: 4,4′-Methylene-bis(2-chloroaniline); Cyanaset; Quodorole; Dacpm; Curalin M; Diamet Kh; Millionate M; Bis amine; MOCA; Bisamine S

Identifiers
CAS Number	101-14-4
3D model (JSmol)	Interactive image
ChEMBL	ChEMBL82846
ChemSpider	7262
ECHA InfoCard	100.002.654
KEGG	C10999
PubChem CID	7543
UNII	3L2W5VTT2A
CompTox Dashboard (EPA)	DTXSID5020865
- InChI: InChI=1S/C13H12Cl2N2/c14-10-6-8(1-3-12(10)16)5-9-2-4-13(17)11(15)7-9/h1-4,6-7H,5,16-17H2 Key: IBOFVQJTBBUKMU-UHFFFAOYSA-N; InChI=1/C13H12Cl2N2/c14-10-6-8(1-3-12(10)16)5-9-2-4-13(17)11(15)7-9/h1-4,6-7H,5,16-17H2 Key: IBOFVQJTBBUKMU-UHFFFAOYAI
- SMILES: Clc1cc(ccc1N)Cc2ccc(N)c(Cl)c2

Properties
Chemical formula	C_{13}H_{12}Cl_{2}N_{2}
Molar mass	267.15 g·mol^{−1}
Appearance	Tan-colored pellets or flakes
Odor	faint, amine-like
Density	1.44 g/cm^{3}
Melting point	104 to 109 °C (219 to 228 °F; 377 to 382 K)
Solubility in water	insoluble
Vapor pressure	0.00001 mmHg (20 °C)

Hazards
- Occupational safety and health (OHS/OSH)
Main hazards	potential occupational carcinogen
NFPA 704 (fire diamond)	2 1 0
Flash point	203 °C (397 °F; 476 K)
- NIOSH (US health exposure limits)
PEL (Permissible)	none
REL (Recommended)	Ca TWA 0.003 mg/m^{3} [skin]
IDLH (Immediate danger)	Ca [N.D.]
- Except where otherwise noted, data are given for materials in their standard state (at 25 °C [77 °F], 100 kPa). verify (what is ?) Infobox references

4,4′-Methylenebis(2-chloroaniline) (also known as MOCA, MBOCA, and bisamine) is a substance used as a curing agent in polyurethane production. MOCA is an aromatic amine which is structurally similar to benzidine, a known human bladder carcinogen. MOCA has been shown to cause hepatomas in mice and rats, lung and mammary carcinomas in rats and bladder cancer in dogs. It is a proven human carcinogen standing on the WHO List of IARC Group 1 carcinogens, with a current threshold limit value of 0.01 ppm in the industrial atmosphere. Animal studies have resulted in tumor growth in the liver, lung, and bladder.

It is a weak base with a slight odor and is reactive to active metals such as sodium, potassium, magnesium and zinc.

== Toxicity ==
Employee exposure is often monitored by measurement of urinary MOCA in free and/or conjugated form. This is the best currently available indicator of MOCA absorption, which is estimated by spot measurement of concentration in urine, creatinine-corrected. Urine concentration is a proxy variable - the measurement is of unmetabolised MOCA - and creatinine-correction affects accuracy. Dose-response curves are also lacking. But despite such limitations the method is a reasonable means of monitoring the effectiveness of engineering controls, personal protective equipment and work practices including education. MOCA levels are usually higher at the end of the shift and reflect exposure over the preceding two to three days. The biological half-life of MOCA in urine is approximately 23 hours.

== Regulation ==
In December 2023, the US EPA announced that it was prioritizing MBOCA "for risk evaluation under the Toxic Substances Control Act (TSCA)" along with four other toxic chemicals.

== See also ==
- Methylene diphenyl diisocyanate
- Toluene diisocyanate
