= N-acetyltransferase 2 =

Protein-coding gene in the species Homo sapiens

NAT2
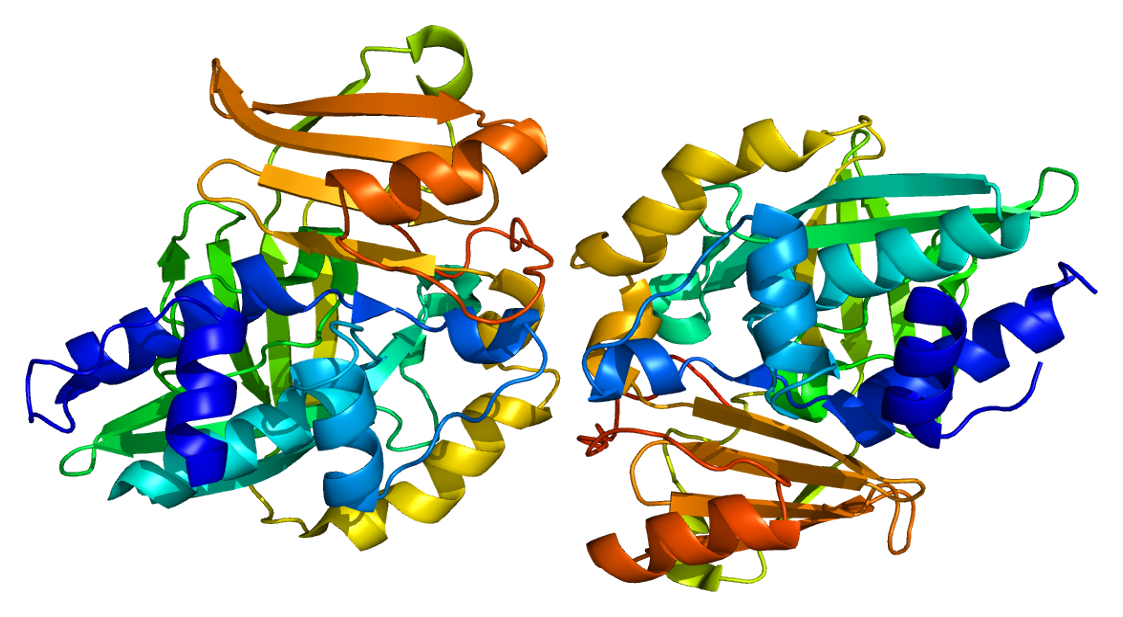

Identifiers
- Aliases: NAT2, AAC2, NAT-2, PNAT, N-acetyltransferase 2, N-acetyltransferase 2 (arylamine N-acetyltransferase)
- External IDs: OMIM: 612182; MGI: 97279; GeneCards: NAT2
Available structures
PDB	Ortholog search: PDBe RCSB
PDB	List of PDB id codes 2PFR
Enzyme activity
EC #	BRENDA	ExPASy	KEGG	MetaCyc
2.3.1.5	↗	↗	↗	↗
2.3.1.118	↗	↗	↗	↗

Gene location (Human)
Chr.	Chromosome 8 (human)
Band	8p22	Start	18,391,282 bp
Band	8p22	End	18,401,218 bp

Gene location (Mouse)
Chr.	Chromosome 8 (mouse)
Band	8 B3.2|8 33.38 cM	Start	67,933,573 bp
Band	8 B3.2|8 33.38 cM	End	67,944,756 bp
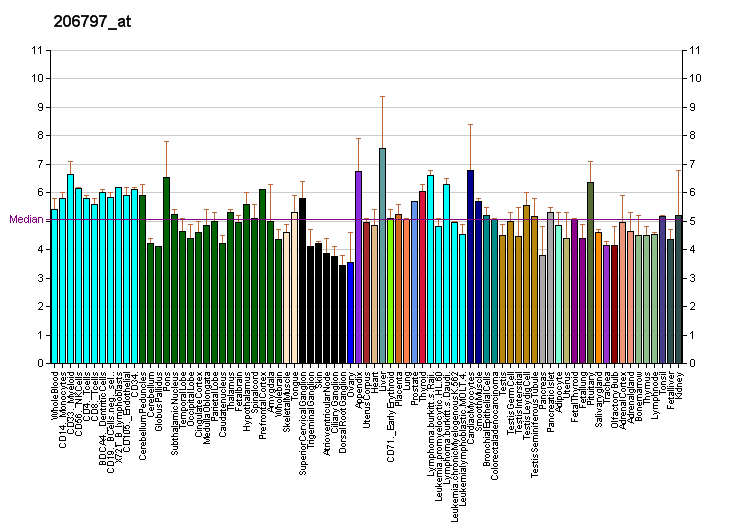
RNA expression pattern
Bgee	Human / Mouse (ortholog); Top expressed in: right lobe of liver; jejunal mucosa; mucosa of ileum; duodenum; mucosa of transverse colon; mucosa of sigmoid colon; rectum; amniotic fluid; appendix; smooth muscle tissue / Top expressed in: morula; embryo; embryo; blastocyst; pineal gland; right kidney; dentate gyrus of hippocampal formation granule cell; respiratory epithelium; nasal epithelium; olfactory epithelium; More reference expression data
BioGPS	More reference expression data
Gene ontology
Molecular function	arylamine N-acetyltransferase activity; transferase activity; acetyltransferase activity; acyltransferase activity; protein binding; N-acetyltransferase activity
Cellular component	cytoplasm; cytosol
Biological process	xenobiotic metabolic process; metabolism
Sources:Amigo / QuickGO
Orthologs
Databases	NCBI: entry; OMA: entry
Species	Human	Mouse
Entrez	10	17960
Ensembl	ENSG00000156006	ENSMUSG00000025588
UniProt	P11245	P50294
RefSeq (mRNA)	NM_000015	NM_008673
RefSeq (protein)	NP_000006	NP_032699
Location (UCSC)	Chr 8: 18.39 – 18.4 Mb	Chr 8: 67.93 – 67.94 Mb
PubMed search
- Wikidata
View/Edit Human	View/Edit Mouse

N-acetyltransferase 2 (arylamine N-acetyltransferase), also known as NAT2, is an enzyme which in humans is encoded by the NAT2 gene.

== Function ==
This gene encodes a type of N-acetyltransferase. The NAT2 isozyme functions to both activate and deactivate arylamine and hydrazine drugs and carcinogens. Polymorphisms in this gene are responsible for the N-acetylation polymorphism in which human populations segregate into rapid, intermediate, and slow acetylator phenotypes. Polymorphisms in NAT2 are also associated with higher incidences of cancer and drug toxicity. A second arylamine N-acetyltransferase gene (NAT1) is located near NAT2.

== Phenotype prediction ==
The NAT2 acetylator phenotype can be inferred from NAT2 genotype (a combination of SNPs observed in a given individual).
