= 4-Nitrobiphenyl =

Names
- Preferred IUPAC name 4-Nitro-1,1′-biphenyl

Identifiers
CAS Number	92-93-3
3D model (JSmol)	Interactive image
ChEBI	CHEBI:82504
ChEMBL	ChEMBL352531
ChemSpider	21109008
DrugBank	DB12300
ECHA InfoCard	100.002.005
EC Number	202-204-7
KEGG	C19473
PubChem CID	7114
RTECS number	DV5600000
UNII	QM80NUW6WZ
UN number	2811
CompTox Dashboard (EPA)	DTXSID9041522
- InChI: InChI=1S/C12H9NO2/c14-13(15)12-8-6-11(7-9-12)10-4-2-1-3-5-10/h1-9H Key: BAJQRLZAPXASRD-UHFFFAOYSA-N
- SMILES: C1=CC=C(C=C1)C2=CC=C(C=C2)[N+](=O)[O-]

Properties
Chemical formula	C_{12}H_{9}NO_{2}
Molar mass	199.209 g·mol^{−1}
Melting point	114 °C (237 °F; 387 K)
Boiling point	340 °C (644 °F; 613 K)
- Except where otherwise noted, data are given for materials in their standard state (at 25 °C [77 °F], 100 kPa). Infobox references

4-Nitrobiphenyl is an organic compound with the formula C_{6}H_{5}−C_{6}H_{4}NO_{2}. It is one of three isomers of nitrobiphenyl and probably the most widely used. It is a precursor to the antioxidant 4-aminobiphenyl. 4-Nitrobiphenyl is readily prepared by nitration of biphenyl. It can also be prepared by cross-coupling reactions.

4-Nitrobiphenyl is commonly invoked as a pollutant.
