= N-acetyltransferase 1 =

Protein-coding gene in the species Homo sapiens

NAT1
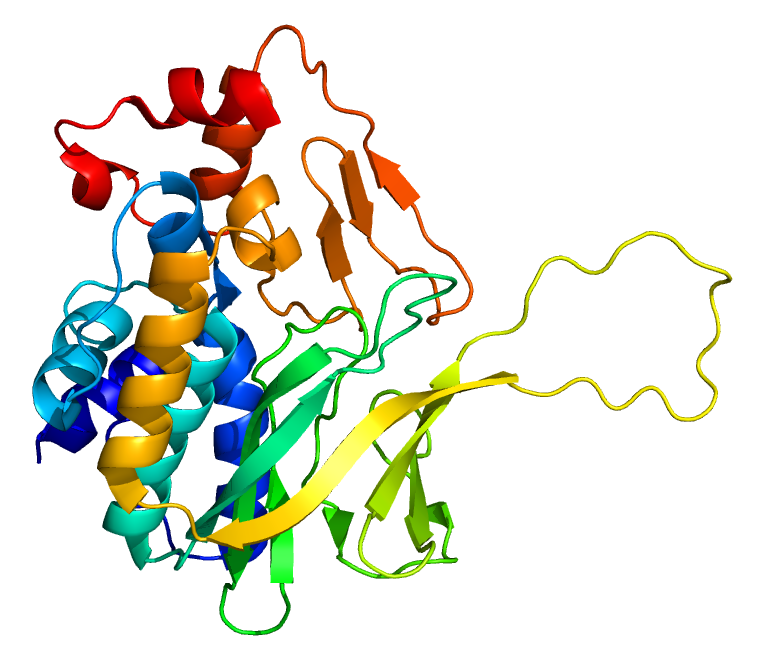

Identifiers
- Aliases: NAT1, AAC1, MNAT, NAT-1, NATI, N-acetyltransferase 1, N-acetyltransferase 1 (arylamine N-acetyltransferase)
- External IDs: OMIM: 108345; MGI: 109201; GeneCards: NAT1
Available structures
PDB	Ortholog search: PDBe RCSB
PDB	List of PDB id codes 2IJA, 2PQT
Enzyme activity
EC #	BRENDA	ExPASy	KEGG	MetaCyc
2.3.1.5	↗	↗	↗	↗

Gene location (Human)
Chr.	Chromosome 8 (human)
Band	8p22	Start	18,170,477 bp
Band	8p22	End	18,223,689 bp

Gene location (Mouse)
Chr.	Chromosome 8 (mouse)
Band	8 B3.2|8 33.38 cM	Start	67,947,510 bp
Band	8 B3.2|8 33.38 cM	End	67,955,236 bp
RNA expression pattern
Bgee	Human / Mouse (ortholog); Top expressed in: bronchial epithelial cell; mucosa of ileum; mucosa of colon; mucosa of sigmoid colon; epithelium of nasopharynx; nasal epithelium; olfactory zone of nasal mucosa; jejunal mucosa; mucosa of paranasal sinus; mucosa of transverse colon / Top expressed in: jejunum; fetal liver hematopoietic progenitor cell; duodenum; epithelium of stomach; left lobe of liver; ileum; epithelium of small intestine; lumbar spinal ganglion; left colon; mucous cell of stomach; More reference expression data
BioGPS	n/a
Gene ontology
Molecular function	arylamine N-acetyltransferase activity; transferase activity; acetyltransferase activity; acyltransferase activity; N-acetyltransferase activity
Cellular component	cytoplasm; cytosol
Biological process	xenobiotic metabolic process; metabolism
Sources:Amigo / QuickGO
Orthologs
Databases	NCBI: entry; OMA: entry
Species	Human	Mouse
Entrez	9	17961
Ensembl	ENSG00000171428	ENSMUSG00000051147
UniProt	P18440; Q400J6	P50295
RefSeq (mRNA)	NM_000662; NM_001160170; NM_001160171; NM_001160172; NM_001160173 NM_001160174; NM_001160175; NM_001160176; NM_001160179; NM_001291962	NM_001168577; NM_010874
RefSeq (protein)	NP_000653; NP_001153642; NP_001153643; NP_001153644; NP_001153645 NP_001153646; NP_001153647; NP_001153648; NP_001153651; NP_001278891; NP_001153642.1; NP_001153644.1; NP_001153645.1; NP_001153646.1; NP_001153647.1	NP_001162049; NP_035004
Location (UCSC)	Chr 8: 18.17 – 18.22 Mb	Chr 8: 67.95 – 67.96 Mb
PubMed search
- Wikidata
View/Edit Human	View/Edit Mouse

N-acetyltransferase 1 (arylamine N-acetyltransferase) is a protein that in humans is encoded by the NAT1 gene.

This gene is one of two arylamine N-acetyltransferase (NAT) genes in the human genome, and is orthologous to the mouse and rat NAT2 genes. The enzyme encoded by this gene catalyzes the transfer of an acetyl group from acetyl-CoA to various arylamine and hydrazine substrates. This enzyme helps metabolize drugs and other xenobiotics, and functions in folate catabolism. Multiple transcript variants encoding different isoforms have been found for this gene. [provided by RefSeq, Aug 2011].
