= Fenton's reagent =

Strongly oxidizing solution of hydrogen peroxide mixed with dissolved iron as catalyst

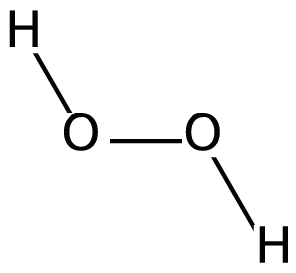
Hydrogen peroxide structural diagram

Fenton's reagent is a solution of hydrogen peroxide (H_{2}O_{2}) and an iron catalyst (typically iron(II) sulfate, FeSO_{4}). It is used to oxidize contaminants or waste water as part of an advanced oxidation process. Fenton's reagent can be used to destroy organic compounds such as trichloroethylene and tetrachloroethylene (perchloroethylene). It was developed in the 1890s by Henry John Horstman Fenton as an analytical reagent.

== Reactions ==
Iron(II) is oxidized by hydrogen peroxide to iron(III), forming a hydroxyl radical and a hydroxide ion in the process. Iron(III) is then reduced back to iron(II) by another molecule of hydrogen peroxide, forming a hydroperoxyl radical and a proton. The net effect is a disproportionation of hydrogen peroxide to create two different oxygen-radical species, with water (H^{+} + OH^{−}) as a byproduct.

Fe^{2+} + H_{2}O_{2} → Fe^{3+} + HO^{•} + OH^{−}	1

Fe^{3+} + H_{2}O_{2} → Fe^{2+} + HOO^{•} + H^{+}	2

2 H_{2}O_{2} → HO^{•} + HOO^{•} + H_{2}O	net reaction: 1+2

The free radicals generated by this process engage in secondary reactions. For example, the hydroxyl is a powerful, non-selective oxidant. Oxidation of an organic compound by Fenton's reagent is rapid and exothermic and results in the oxidation of contaminants to primarily carbon dioxide and water.

Reaction (1) was suggested by Haber and Weiss in the 1930s as part of what would become the Haber–Weiss reaction.

Iron(II) sulfate is typically used as the iron catalyst. The exact mechanisms of the redox cycle are uncertain, and non-OH^{•} oxidizing mechanisms of organic compounds have also been suggested. Therefore, it may be appropriate to broadly discuss Fenton chemistry rather than a specific Fenton reaction.

In the electro-Fenton process, hydrogen peroxide is produced in situ from the electrochemical reduction of oxygen.

Fenton's reagent is also used in organic synthesis for the hydroxylation of arenes in a radical substitution reaction such as the classical conversion of benzene into phenol.

C_{6}H_{6} + FeSO_{4} + H_{2}O_{2} → C_{6}H_{5}OH + (byproducts)	3

An example hydroxylation reaction involves the oxidation of barbituric acid to alloxan. Another application of the reagent in organic synthesis is in coupling reactions of alkanes. As an example tert-butanol is dimerized with Fenton's reagent and sulfuric acid to 2,5-dimethyl-2,5-hexanediol. Fenton's reagent is also widely used in the field of environmental science for water purification and soil remediation. Various hazardous wastewater were reported to be effectively degraded through Fenton's reagent.

== Effect of pH on formation of free radicals ==
pH affects the reaction rate due to a variety of reasons. At a low pH, complexation of Fe^{2+} also occurs, leading to lower availability of Fe^{2+} to form reactive oxidative species (OH^{•}). Lower pH also results in the scavenging of ^{•}OH by excess H^{+}, hence reducing its reaction rate. Whereas at high pH, the reaction slows down due to precipitation of Fe(OH)_{3}, lowering the concentration of the Fe^{3+} species in solution. Solubility of iron species is directly governed by the solution's pH. Fe^{3+} is about 100 times less soluble than Fe^{2+} in natural water at near-neutral pH, the ferric ion concentration is the limiting factor for the reaction rate. Under high pH conditions, the stability of the H_{2}O_{2} is also affected, resulting in its self-decomposition. Higher pH also decreased the redox potential of ^{•}OH thereby reducing its effectiveness. pH plays a crucial role in the formation of free radicals and hence the reaction performance. Thus ongoing research has been done to optimize pH and amongst other parameters for greater reaction rates.

Impacts of operation pH on reaction rate
Low pH	Formation of [Fe(H_{2}O)_{6}]^{2+} complex, hence reducing Fe^{2+} for radical generation
Low pH	Scavenging of ^{•}OH by excess H^{+}
High pH	Lower redox potential of ^{•}OH
High pH	Self-decomposition of H_{2}O_{2} due to decreased stability at high pH
High pH	Precipitation of Fe(OH)_{3} species in solution

== Biomedical implications ==
The Fenton reaction has different implications in biology because it involves the formation of free radicals by chemical species naturally present in the cell under in vivo conditions. Transition-metal ions such as iron and copper can donate or accept free electrons via intracellular reactions and so contribute to the formation, or at the contrary to the scavenging, of free radicals. Superoxide ions and transition metals act in a synergistic way in the appearance of free radical damages. Therefore, although the clinical significance is still unclear, it is one of the viable reasons to avoid iron supplementation in patients with active infections, whereas other reasons include iron-mediated infections.

== Applications ==
Fenton's reagent is used as a sewage treatment agent.

Fenton's reagent can be used in different chemical processes that supply hydroxyl ion or oxidize certain compounds:

- The first stage of Fenton's reaction (oxidation of Fe^{3+} with hydrogen peroxide) is used in Haber–Weiss reaction
- Fenton's reagent can be used in organic synthesis reactions: e.g. hydroxylation of arenes via a free radical substitution
- Conversion of benzene into phenol by using Fenton's reagent
- Oxidation of barbituric acid into alloxan.
- Coupling reactions of alkanes

== Fenton-like reagent ==
Mixtures of Fe^{2+} and H_{2}O_{2} are called Fenton reagent. If Fe^{2+} is replaced by Fe^{3+}, it is called Fenton-like reagent.

Numerous transition metal ions and their complexes in their lower oxidation states (L_{m}M^{n+}) were found to have the oxidative features of the Fenton reagent, and, therefore, the mixtures of these metal compounds with H_{2}O_{2} were named "Fenton-like" reagents.

== See also ==
- Carbon monoxide-releasing molecules
