= Leighton relationship =

Equation in atmospheric chemistry

In atmospheric chemistry, the Leighton relationship is an equation that determines the concentration of tropospheric ozone in areas polluted by the presence of nitrogen oxides. Ozone in the troposphere is primarily produced through the photolysis of nitrogen dioxide by photons with wavelengths (λ) less than 420 nanometers, which are able to reach the lowest levels of the atmosphere, through the following mechanism:

NO_{2} + hν (λ < 420 nm) → NO + O(^{3}P)	J_{1}

O(^{3}P) + O_{2} + M → O_{3} + M	k_{2}

NO + O_{3} → NO_{2} + O_{2}	k_{3}

The symbol M represents a "third body", an unspecified molecular species that must interact with the reactants in order to carry away energy from the exothermic reaction. The ^{3}P designation on the atomic O species is the term symbol for its electronic state, indicating that it is in a spin triplet state, which is the ground electronic state of atomic O. This series of reactions creates a null cycle, in which there is no net production or loss of any species involved. Since O(^{3}P) is very reactive and O_{2} is abundant, O(^{3}P) can be assumed to be in steady state, and thus an equation linking the concentrations of the species involved can be derived, giving the Leighton relationship:

$$[\ce{O3}]=\frac{J_1[\ce{NO2}]}{k_3[\ce{NO}]}$$

This equation shows how production of ozone is directly related to the solar intensity, and hence to the zenith angle, due to the reliance on photolysis of NO_{2}. The yield of ozone will therefore be greatest during the day, especially at noon and during the summer season. This relationship also demonstrates how high concentrations of both ozone and nitric oxide are unfeasible. However, NO can react with peroxyl radicals to produce NO_{2} without loss of ozone:

RO_{2} + NO → NO_{2} + RO

thus providing another pathway to allow for the buildup of ozone by breaking the above null cycle.

This relationship is named after Philip Leighton, author of the 1961 book Photochemistry of Air Pollution, in recognition of his contributions in the understanding of tropospheric chemistry. Computer models of atmospheric chemistry utilize the Leighton relationship to minimize complexity by deducing the concentration of one of ozone, nitrogen dioxide, and nitric oxide when the concentrations of the other two are known.
