= Ground-level ozone =

Constituent gas of the troposphere

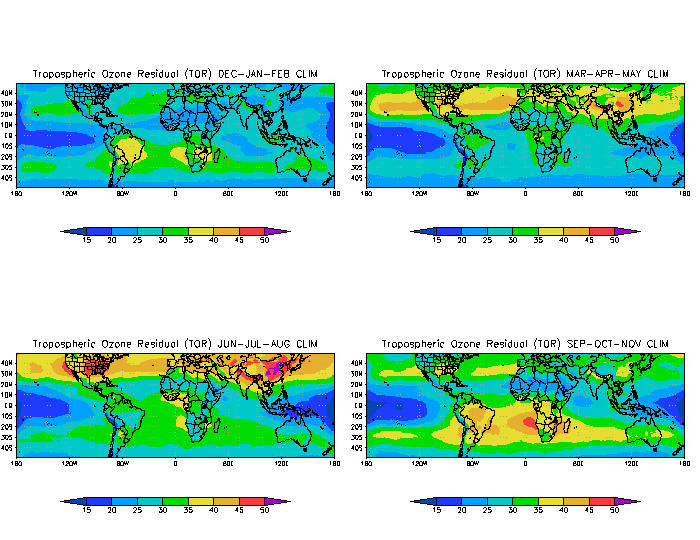
Seasonal average vertical columns of tropospheric ozone in Dobson units over the period 1979 to 2000. In June to August, photochemical ozone production causes very high concentrations over the East Coast of the US and China.

Ground-level ozone (O_{3}), also known as surface-level ozone and tropospheric ozone, is a trace gas in the troposphere (the lowest level of the Earth's atmosphere), with an average concentration of 20–30 parts per billion by volume (ppbv), with close to 100 ppbv in polluted areas. Ozone is also an important constituent of the stratosphere, where the ozone layer (2 to 8 parts per million ozone) exists which is located between 10 and 50 kilometers above the Earth's surface. The troposphere extends from the ground up to a variable height of approximately 14 kilometers above sea level. Ozone is least concentrated in the ground layer (or planetary boundary layer) of the troposphere.

Ground-level or tropospheric ozone is created by chemical reactions between NOx gases (oxides of nitrogen produced by combustion) and volatile organic compounds (VOCs). The combination of these chemicals in the presence of sunlight form ozone. Its concentration increases as height above sea level increases, with a maximum concentration at the tropopause. About 90% of total ozone in the atmosphere is in the stratosphere, and 10% is in the troposphere. Although ground-level ozone is less concentrated than stratospheric ozone, it is of concern because of its health effects. Ozone in the troposphere is a greenhouse gas, and as such contribute to global warming. It is the third most important greenhouse gas after CO_{2} and CH_{4}, as indicated by estimates of its radiative forcing.

Photochemical and chemical reactions involving ozone drive many of the chemical processes that occur in the troposphere by day and by night. At abnormally high concentrations (the largest source being emissions from combustion of fossil fuels), it is a pollutant, and a constituent of smog. Its levels have increased significantly since the industrial revolution, as NOx gasses and VOCs are some of the byproducts of combustion. With more heat and sunlight in the summer months, more ozone is formed which is why regions often experience higher levels of pollution in the summer months. Although the same molecule, ground-level ozone can be harmful to human health, unlike stratospheric ozone that protects the earth from excess UV radiation.

Photolysis of ozone occurs at wavelengths below approximately 310–320 nanometres. This reaction initiates a chain of chemical reactions that remove carbon monoxide, methane, and other hydrocarbons from the atmosphere via oxidation. Therefore, the concentration of tropospheric ozone affects how long these compounds remain in the air. If the oxidation of carbon monoxide or methane occur in the presence of nitrogen monoxide (NO), this chain of reactions has a net product of ozone added to the system.

== Measurement ==
Ozone in the atmosphere can be measured by remote sensing technology, or by in-situ monitoring technology. Because ozone absorbs light in the UV spectrum, the most common way to measure ozone is to measure how much of this light spectrum is absorbed in the atmosphere. Because the stratosphere has higher ozone concentration than the troposphere, it is important for remote sensing instruments to be able to determine altitude along with the concentration measurements. A total ozone mapping spectrometer-earth probe (TOMS-EP) aboard a satellite from NASA is an example of an ozone layer measuring satellite, and the tropospheric emission spectrometer (TES) is an example of an ozone measuring satellite that is specifically for the troposphere. LIDAR is a common ground-based remote sensing technique that uses laser to measure ozone. The Tropospheric Ozone Lidar Network (TOLNet) is the network of ozone observing lidars across the United States.

Ozonesondes are a form of in situ, or local ozone measuring instruments. An ozonesonde is attached to a meteorological balloon, so that the instrument can directly measure ozone concentration at the varying altitudes along the balloon's upward path. The information collected from the instrument attached to the balloon is transmitted back using radiosonde technology. NOAA has worked to create a global network of tropospheric ozone measurements using ozonesondes.

Ozone is also measured in air quality environmental monitoring networks. In these networks, in-situ ozone monitors based on ozone's UV-absorption properties are used to measure ppb-levels in ambient air.

Total atmospheric ozone (sometimes seen in weather reports) is measured in a column from the surface to the top of the atmosphere, and is dominated by high concentrations of stratospheric ozone. Typical units of measure for this purpose include the Dobson unit and millimoles per square meter (mmol/m^{2}).

== Formation ==
The majority of ground-level ozone formation occurs when nitrogen oxides (NOx), carbon monoxide (CO), and volatile organic compounds (VOCs), react in the atmosphere in the presence of sunlight, specifically the UV spectrum. NOx, CO, and VOCs are considered ozone precursors. Motor vehicle exhaust, industrial emissions, and chemical solvents are the major anthropogenic sources of these ozone precursors. Although the ozone precursors often originate in urban areas, winds can carry NOx hundreds of kilometers, causing ozone formation to occur in less populated regions as well. Methane, a VOC whose atmospheric concentration has increased tremendously during the last century, contributes to ozone formation but on a global scale rather than in local or regional photochemical smog episodes. In situations where this exclusion of methane from the VOC group of substances is not obvious, the term non-methane volatile organic compound (NMVOC) is often used.

Indoors ozone is produced by certain high-voltage electric devices (such as air ionizers) and as a by-product of other types of pollution. Outdoor air used for ventilation may have sufficient ozone to react with common indoor pollutants as well as skin oils and other common indoor air chemicals or surfaces. Particular concern is warranted when using "green" cleaning products based on citrus or terpene extracts, because these chemicals react very quickly with ozone to form toxic and irritating chemicals as well as fine and ultrafine particles.

The chemical reactions involved in ground-level ozone formation are a series of complex cycles in which carbon monoxide and VOCs are oxidised to water vapour and carbon dioxide. The reactions involved in this process are illustrated here with CO but similar reactions occur for VOC as well. The oxidation begins with the reaction of CO with the hydroxyl radical (^{•}OH). The radical intermediate formed by this reacts rapidly with oxygen to give a peroxy radical HO_{2}^{•}

An outline of the chain reaction that occurs in oxidation of CO, producing O_{3}:

The reaction begins with the oxidation of CO by the hydroxyl radical (^{•}OH). The radical adduct (•HOCO) is unstable and reacts rapidly with oxygen to give a peroxy radical, HO_{2}^{•}:

•OH + CO → •HOCO
•HOCO + O_{2} → HO_{2}• + CO_{2}

Peroxy-radicals then go on to react with NO to produce NO_{2}, which is photolysed by UV-A radiation to give a ground-state atomic oxygen, which then reacts with molecular oxygen to form ozone.

HO_{2}^{•} + NO → ^{•}OH + NO_{2}
NO_{2} + hν → NO + O(^{3}P), λ<400 nm
O(^{3}P) + O_{2} → O_{3}
note that these three reactions are what forms the ozone molecule, and will occur the same way in the oxidation of CO or VOCs case.

The net reaction in this case is then:

CO + 2O_{2} → CO_{2} + O_{3}

The amount of ozone produced through these reactions in ambient air can be estimated using a modified Leighton relationship. The limit on these interrelated cycles producing ozone is the reaction of •OH with NO_{2} to form nitric acid at high NOx levels. If nitrogen monoxide (NO) is instead present at very low levels in the atmosphere (less than 10 approximately ppt), the peroxy radicals (HO_{2}•) formed from the oxidation will instead react with themselves to form peroxides, and not produce ozone.

== Health effects ==
Ozone is an acutely toxic gas.

Health effects depend on ozone precursors, which is a group of pollutants, primarily generated during the combustion of fossil fuels. Ground-level ozone is created by nitrous oxides reacting with organic compounds in the presence of sunlight. There are many man-made sources of these organic compounds including vehicle and industrial emissions, along with several other sources. Reaction with daylight ultraviolet (UV) rays and these precursors create ground-level ozone pollution. Ozone is known to have the following health effects at concentrations common in urban air:

- Irritation of the respiratory system, causing coughing, throat irritation, and/or an uncomfortable sensation in the chest. Ozone affects people with underlying respiratory conditions such as asthma, chronic obstructive pulmonary disease (COPD), and lung cancer as well those who spend a lot of time being active outdoors.
- Reduced lung function, making it more difficult to breathe deeply and vigorously. Breathing may become more rapid and more shallow than normal, and a person's ability to engage in vigorous activities may be limited. Ozone causes the muscles in the airways to constrict which traps air in the alveoli leading to wheezing and shortness of breath.
- Aggravation of asthma. When ozone levels are high, more people with asthma have attacks that require a doctor's attention or use of medication. One reason this happens is that ozone makes people more sensitive to allergens, which in turn trigger asthma attacks.
- Increased susceptibility to respiratory infections. Examples of these respiratory complications include bronchitis, emphysema, and asthma.
- Inflammation and damage to the lining of the lungs. Within a few days, the damaged cells are shed and replaced much like the skin peels after a sunburn. Animal studies suggest that if this type of inflammation happens repeatedly over a long time period (months, years, a lifetime), lung tissue may become permanently scarred, resulting in permanent loss of lung function and a lower quality of life.
- More recent data suggests that ozone can also have harmful effects via the inflammatory pathway leading to heart disease, type 2 diabetes, and other metabolic disorders.

It was observed in the 1990s that ground-level ozone can advance death by a few days in predisposed and vulnerable populations. A statistical study of 95 large urban communities in the United States found significant association between ozone levels and premature death. The study estimated that a one-third reduction in urban ozone concentrations would save roughly 4000 lives per year (Bell et al., 2004). Ground-level ozone causes approximately 22,000 premature deaths per year in 25 countries in the European Union. (WHO, 2008)

In addition to respiratory irritation, ground-level ozone exposure is associated with broader public health burdens. Short-term exposure can lead to increased hospital visits, school and work absences, and medication use due to aggravated asthma and other respiratory conditions. Long-term exposure has been linked to impaired lung function and an increased incidence of cardiovascular issues including strokes and premature mortality, particularly during warm seasons when ozone concentrations are elevated.

== Problem areas ==
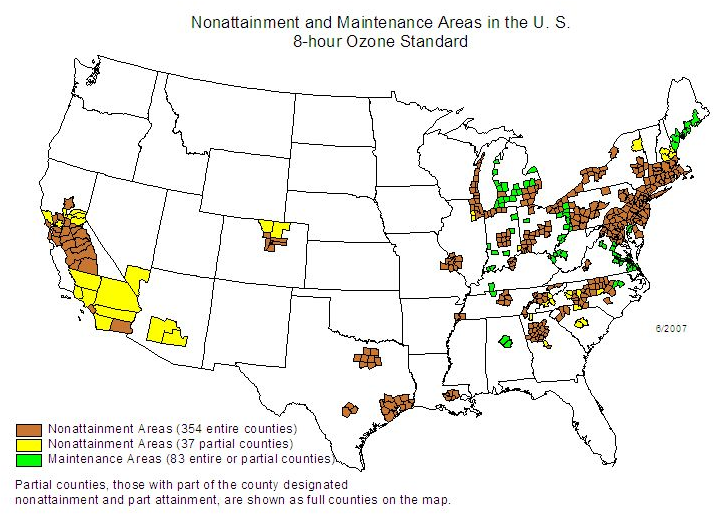

The United States Environmental Protection Agency has developed an Air Quality index to help explain air pollution levels to the general public. 8-hour average ozone mole fractions of 76 to 95 nmol/mol are described as "Unhealthy for Sensitive Groups", 96 nmol/mol to 115 nmol/mol as unhealthy and 116 nmol/mol to 404 nmol/mol as very unhealthy. The EPA has designated over 300 counties of the United States, clustered around the most heavily populated areas (especially in California and the Northeast), as failing to comply with the National Ambient Air Quality Standards.

In 2000, the Ozone Annex was added to the U.S.–Canada Air Quality Agreement. The Ozone Annex addresses transboundary air pollution that contributes to ground-level ozone, which contributes to smog. The main goal was to attain proper ozone air quality standards in both countries. The North Front Range of Colorado has been out of compliance with the Federal Air Quality standards. The U.S. EPA designated Fort Collins as part of the ozone non-attainment area in November 2007. This means that the U.S.'s environmental law considers the air quality to be worse than the National Ambient Air Quality Standards, which are defined in the Clean Air Act Amendments. In 2024, the Lung Association ranked Fort Collins 16th in the nation for high ozone days out of 228 metropolitan areas, 38 for 24-hour particle pollution out of 223 metropolitan areas, and 136 for annual particle pollution out of 204 metropolitan areas.

In monitoring air quality, Boulder County, Colorado is classified by the EPA as part of a nine-county group that includes the Denver metro area and North Front Range region. This nine-county zone has recorded ozone levels that exceed the EPA's ozone standard since 2004. Attempts have been made under the Early Action Compact to bring the area's air quality up to the EPA's standards. However, since 2004 ozone pollution in Boulder County has regularly failed to meet federal standards set by the Environmental Protection Agency. The County of Boulder continues trying to alleviate some of the ozone pollution through programming that encourages people to drive less, and stop ozone polluting activities during the heat of the day.

== Ozone and the climate ==
Ground-level ozone is both naturally occurring and anthropogenically formed. It is the primary constituent of urban smog, forming naturally as a secondary pollutant through photochemical reactions involving nitrogen oxides and volatile organic compounds in the presence of bright sunshine with high temperatures.

Regardless of whether it occurs naturally or is anthropogenically formed, the change in ozone concentrations in the upper troposphere will:

- exert a considerable impact on global warming, because it is a key air pollutant and greenhouse gas, and
- impact the production of surface level ozone (contributing again to climate change).

As a result, photochemical smog pollution at the earth's surface, as well as stratospheric ozone depletion, have received a lot of attention in recent years. The disruptions in the "free troposphere" are likely to be the focus of the next cycle of scientific concern. In several parts of the northern hemisphere, tropospheric ozone levels have been rising. On various scales, this may have an impact on moisture levels, cloud volume and dispersion, precipitation, and atmospheric dynamics. A rising environment, on the other hand, favours ozone synthesis and accumulation in the atmosphere, owing to two physicochemical mechanisms. First, a warming climate alters humidity and wind conditions in some parts of the world, resulting in a reduction in the frequency of surface cyclones.

=== Climate change impacts on processes that affect ozone ===
Changes in air temperature and water content affect the air's chemistry and the rates of chemical reactions that create and remove ozone. Many chemical reaction rates increase with temperature and lead to increased ozone production. Climate change projections show that rising temperatures and water vapour in the atmosphere will likely increase surface ozone in polluted areas like the eastern United States. In particular, the degradation of the pollutant peroxyacetyl nitrate (PAN), which is a significant reservoir species for long-range transport of ozone precursors, is accelerated by rising temperatures. As a result, as the temperature rises, the lifetime of PAN reduces, changing the long-range transport of ozone pollution. Second, the same CO_{2} radiative forcing that causes global warming would chill the stratosphere. This cooling is projected to result in a relative rise in ozone depletion in the polar region, as well as an increase in the frequency of ozone holes.

Ozone depletion, on the other hand, is a radiative forcing of the climate system. Two opposite effects exist: Reduced ozone causes the stratosphere to absorb less solar radiation, cooling it while warming the troposphere; as a result, the stratosphere emits less long-wave radiation downward, cooling the troposphere. The IPCC believes that "measured stratospheric O3 losses over the past two decades have generated a negative forcing of the surface-troposphere system" of around 0.15 0.10 watts per square metre (W/m^{2}). Furthermore, rising air temperatures often improve ozone-forming processes, which has a repercussion on climate, as well.

Ozone production rises during heat waves, because plants absorb less ozone. It is estimated that curtailed ozone absorption by plants could be responsible for the loss of 460 lives in the UK in the hot summer of 2006. A similar investigation to assess the joint effects of ozone and heat during the European heat waves in 2003, concluded that these appear to be additive.

In the Arctic, due to climate change, "the sea ice that lasts from one winter to the next is decreasing. This has created a larger area of melted ice, and more ice that comes and goes with the seasons. This seasonal variation in ice could release more molecular chlorine into the atmosphere." "The level of molecular chlorine above Barrow was measured as high as 400 parts per trillion." "The ultimate source of the molecular chlorine is the sodium chloride in sea salt, most likely from the snow-covered ice pack. How the sea salt is transformed into molecular chlorine is unknown." The molecular chlorine reacts with UV radiation, producing highly reactive chlorine radicals that expedite the degradation of methane and tropospheric ozone, and oxidize mercury into more toxic forms.

== See also ==
- Atmospheric chemistry
- National Ambient Air Quality Standards (USA)
- Ozone
- Photochemical smog
- Troposphere
- Tropospheric ozone depletion events
