= Haber–Weiss reaction =

Chemical reaction

The Haber–Weiss reaction generates •OH (hydroxyl radicals) from H_{2}O_{2} (hydrogen peroxide) and superoxide (•O_{2}^{−}) catalyzed by iron ions. It was first proposed by Fritz Haber and his student Joseph Joshua Weiss in 1932.

This reaction has long been studied and revived in different contexts, including organic chemistry, free radicals, radiochemistry, and water radiolysis. In the 1970, with the emerging interest for the effect of free radicals onto the ageing mechanisms of living cells due to oxygen (O_{2}), it was proposed that the Haber–Weiss reaction was a source of radicals responsible for cellular oxidative stress. However, this hypothesis was later disproved by several research works. The oxidative stress toxicity is not caused by the Haber–Weiss reaction as a whole, but by the Fenton reaction, which is one specific part of it.

The reaction is kinetically slow, but is catalyzed by dissolved iron ions. The first step of the catalytic cycle involves the reduction of the ferric (Fe^{3+}) ion into the ferrous (Fe^{2+}) ion:

Fe^{3+} + •O_{2}^{−} → Fe^{2+} + O_{2}

The second step is the Fenton reaction:

Fe^{2+} + H_{2}O_{2} → Fe^{3+} + OH^{−} + •OH

Net reaction:

•O_{2}^{−} + H_{2}O_{2} → •OH + OH^{−} + O_{2}

== Haber-Weiss chain reaction ==
The main finding of Haber and Weiss was that hydrogen peroxide (H_{2}O_{2}) is decomposed by a chain reaction.

The Haber–Weiss reaction chain proceeds by successive steps: (i) initiation, (ii) propagation and (iii) termination.

The chain is initiated by the Fenton reaction:

Fe^{2+} + H_{2}O_{2} → Fe^{3+} + HO^{–} + HO^{•} (step 1: initiation)

Then, the reaction chain propagates by means of two successive steps:

HO^{•} + H_{2}O_{2} → H_{2}O + O_{2}^{•–} + H^{+} (step 2: propagation)

O_{2}^{•–} + H^{+} + H_{2}O_{2} → O_{2} + HO^{•} + H_{2}O (step 3: propagation)

Finally, the chain is terminated when the hydroxyl radical is scavenged by a ferrous ion:

Fe^{2+} + HO^{•} + H^{+} → Fe^{3+} + H_{2}O (step 4: termination)

George showed in 1947 that, in water, step 3 cannot compete with the spontaneous disproportionation of superoxide, and proposed an improved mechanism for the disappearance of hydrogen peroxide. See for a summary. The reactions proposed therein are:

Fe^{2+} + H_{2}O_{2} → Fe^{3+} + HO^{–} + HO^{•} (initiation)

Fe^{2+} + HO^{•} → Fe^{3+} + HO^{–} (termination)

H_{2}O_{2} + HO^{•} → H_{2}O + HO_{2}^{•} (propagation)

Fe^{2+} + HO_{2}^{•} → Fe^{3+} + HO_{2}^{−} (termination)

Fe^{3+} + HO_{2}^{•} → Fe^{2+} + O_{2} + H^{+} (termination)

== Hydroperoxyl and superoxide radicals ==
With time, various chemical notations for the hydroperoxyl (perhydroxyl) radical coexist in the literature. Haber, Wilstätter and Weiss simply wrote HO_{2} or O_{2}H, but sometimes HO_{2}^{•} or ^{•}O_{2}H can also be found to stress the radical character of the species.

The hydroperoxyl radical is a weak acid and gives rise to the superoxide radical (O_{2}^{•–}) when it loses a proton:

HO_{2} → H^{+} + O_{2}^{–}

sometimes also written as:

HO_{2}^{•} → H^{+} + O_{2}^{•–}

A first pK_{a} value of 4.88 for the dissociation of the hydroperoxyl radical was determined in 1970. The presently accepted value is 4.7. This pK_{a} value is close to that of acetic acid. Below a pH of 4.7, the protonated hydroperoxyl radical will dominate in solution while at pH above 4.7 the superoxide radical anion will be the main species.

== Effect of pH on the reaction rate ==
As the Haber–Weiss reaction depends on the presence of both Fe^{3+} and Fe^{2+} in solution, its kinetics is influenced by the respective solubilities of both species whose are directly function of the solution pH. As Fe^{3+} is about 100 times less soluble than Fe^{2+} in natural waters at near-neutral pH, the ferric ion concentration is the limiting factor for the reaction rate. The reaction can only proceed with a fast enough rate under sufficiently acidic conditions. At high pH, under alkaline conditions, the reaction considerably slows down because of the precipitation of Fe(OH)_{3} which notably lowers the concentration of the Fe^{3+} species in solution.

Moreover, the pH value also directly influences the acid-base dissociation equilibrium involving the hydroperoxyl and the superoxide radicals (pK_{a} = 4.7) as mentioned above.

== See also ==
- Fenton's reagent
