= Peroxyacyl nitrates =

Pollutant chemicals of the form R–C(O)OONO2

In organic chemistry, peroxyacyl nitrates (also known as Acyl peroxy nitrates, APN or PANs) are powerful respiratory and eye irritants present in photochemical smog. They are nitrates produced in the thermal equilibrium between organic peroxy radicals by the gas-phase oxidation of a variety of volatile organic compounds (VOCs). Another way to produce PANs is by aldehydes and other oxygenated VOCs oxidizing in the presence of NO_{2}.

They are good markers for the source of VOCs as either biogenic or anthropogenic, which is useful in the study of global and local effects of pollutants.

== Formation ==
PANs are secondary pollutants, which means they are not directly emitted as exhaust from power plants or internal combustion engines, but they are formed from other pollutants by chemical reactions in the atmosphere. Free radical reactions catalyzed by ultraviolet light from the sun oxidize unburned non-methane hydrocarbons to aldehydes, ketones, and dicarbonyls, whose secondary reactions create peroxyacyl radicals. The most common peroxyacyl radical is peroxyacetyl, which can be formed from the free radical oxidation of acetaldehyde, various ketones, or the photolysis of dicarbonyl compounds such as methylglyoxal or diacetyl.

Hydrocarbons + O_{2} + light → RC(O)OO^{•}

These react reversibly with nitrogen dioxide (NO_{2}) to form PANs:

RC(O)OO^{•} + NO_{2}^{•} ⇌ RC(O)OONO_{2}

Night-time reaction of aldehydes with nitrogen trioxide is another possible source.

The stability of PANs in the atmosphere is dependent on temperature. The lower temperatures in the troposphere increase the stability and therefore lifetime of PANs. Since they dissociate quite slowly in the atmosphere into radicals and NO_{2}, PANs are able to transport these unstable compounds far away from their urban and industrial origins. This causes a decrease in photochemical ozone production near sources of NO_{x} as PANs are a NO_{x} reservoir, reducing the amount of NO_{x} photolyzed. This allows PANs to transport NO_{x} to regions where it can more efficiently produce tropospheric ozone.

== Types ==
Peroxyacetyl nitrate is the first member of PANs identified by scientists in the 1950s and the most prevalent peroxyacyl nitrate (75–90% of total atmospheric emissions), followed by peroxypropionyl nitrate (PPN), the second member of PANs discovered from synthetic mixtures. The third member of the PANs class is peroxybutyryl nitrate (PBN), which is only been known to be synthetically made. Peroxybenzoyl nitrate (PBzN) and methacryloyl peroxynitrate (MPAN) have also been observed. The composition of PANs in a particular region depends heavily on which hydrocarbons are present in the atmosphere, with the exception of peroxyacetyl nitrate, which is able to be produced from a range of precursors.^{: 7624}

== Health effects ==
PANs are both toxic and irritating, as they dissolve more readily in water than ozone. They are lachrymators, causing eye irritation at concentrations of only a few parts per billion. At higher concentrations they cause extensive damage to vegetation.

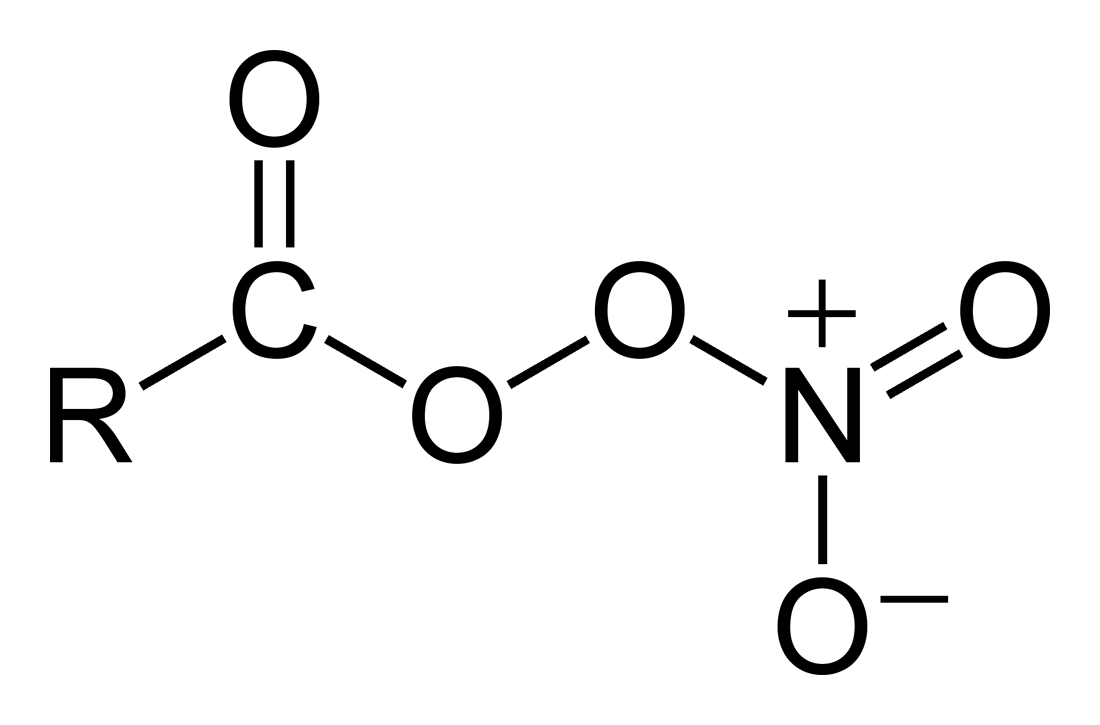
The general structural formula of a peroxyacyl nitrate

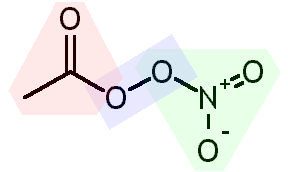
peroxyacetyl nitrate, the most common PAN
