= Non-methane volatile organic compound =

Non-methane volatile organic compounds (NMVOCs) are a set of organic compounds that are typically photochemically reactive in the atmosphere—marked by the exclusion of methane. NMVOCs include a large variety of chemically different compounds, such as benzene, ethanol, formaldehyde, cyclohexane, 1,1,1-trichloroethane and acetone. Essentially, NMVOCs are identical to volatile organic compounds (VOCs), but with methane excluded. Methane is excluded in air-pollution contexts because it is not toxic. It is however a very potent greenhouse gas, with low reactivity and thus a long lifetime in the atmosphere. An important subset of NMVOCs are the non-methane hydrocarbons (NMHCs).

Sometimes NMVOC is also used as a sum parameter for emissions, where all NMVOC emissions are added up per weight into one figure. In absence of more detailed data, this can be a very coarse parameter for pollution (e.g. for summer smog or indoor air pollution).

The major sources of NMVOCs include vegetation, biomass burning, geogenic sources, and human activity.

Trimethylbenzene is an important NMVOC due to its high photochemical reactivity to form ozone in the atmosphere.

== Importance of atmospheric chemistry ==
The study of NMVOCs is important in atmospheric chemistry, where it can be used as a proxy to study the collective properties of reactive atmospheric VOCs. The exclusion of methane is necessary due to its relatively high ambient concentration in comparison to other atmospheric species and its relative inertness. NMVOCs is an umbrella term which encompasses all speciated and oxygenated biogenic, anthropogenic, and pyrogenic organic molecules present in the atmosphere, minus the contribution of methane. The necessity of this term is also governed by current estimates which suggest that somewhere between 10,000 and 100,000 NMVOCs are present in the atmosphere, most with concentrations in the realm of parts per billion or parts per trillion. The aggregation of these compounds and their collective properties are easier to study than the individual components.

Many NMVOCs carry importance due to their influence on atmospheric ozone. Ground level ozone is not directly emitted, but is instead formed by the reaction of sunlight with various other emitted compounds, including NMHCs (a type of NMVOC), methane, carbon monoxide, and nitrogen oxides.

== Biogenic emission ==
In some non-urban areas, biogenic emissions of NMVOCs meet or exceed anthropogenic emissions of NMVOCs.

=== Vegetation emissions ===
There are estimated to be 40 or less NMVOC classified compounds emitted from vegetation that actively influence atmospheric composition, as many NMVOCs are either weakly volatile or are unlikely to be emitted at high volume into the atmosphere. These atmospherically important NMVOCs include compounds such as terpenoids, hexenals, alkenes, aldehydes, organic acids, alcohols, ketones, and alkanes). These NMVOCs which are emitted by vegetation can be divided by source as having originated from one of seven processes:

- Emissions from chloroplast activity
- Emissions from specialized defense tissues
- Emissions from defense processes not related to defense specialized tissues
- Emissions of plant growth hormones
- Emissions from cut and drying vegetation
- Emissions of floral scents
- Other vegetation related emissions

Of these processes, chlorophyll related emissions and emissions from specialized defense tissues are understood to the point of numerical description. This has led to the characterization of all other emissions processes (besides chlorophyll related emissions) using the model of emissions from specialized defense tissues.

=== Soil microbe emissions ===
Many NMVOCs are produced by soil microorganisms (such as methane, ethane, and isoprene). However, due to the ability for many other soil microorganisms to metabolize these compounds, soils sometimes act as a sink for NMVOCs, leading to the belief that NMVOC flux from soil is negligible.

=== Biomass burning ===
Biomass burning, other than for use as fuel, is considered to be a biogenic source. These emissions are modeled based on the area burned, the ratio of above ground biomass to total biomass, the density of the burned organic matter, and combustion efficiency.

The chemical composition of emissions from biomass burning varies across different stages of burning, but total NMVOCs emitted from burning is estimated to be 4.5 grams of Carbon per kilogram. The main NMVOCs emitted from burning are ethane, propane, propene, and acetylene.

=== Geogenic sources ===
Major geogenic sources of NMVOCs include volcanism and seepage resulting from natural gas.

Volcanism results in the emissions of many NMVOCs, but at negligible rates. Natural gas seepage is estimated to result in emissions of approximately 0.06 o 2.6 μg m^{−2} h^{−1}.

== Anthropogenic emissions ==
In the European Database for Global Atmospheric Research (EDGAR), anthropogenic sources of NMVOCs are divided into the following categories:

1. Power generation
2. Combustion for manufacturing
3. Energy for buildings
4. Road transportation
5. Transformation Industry
6. Fugitive emissions from fuel exploitation
7. Emissions from production processes
8. Oil Refineries
9. Agricultural waste burning
10. Shipping
11. Railways, pipelines, and off-road transport
12. Fossil Fuel Fires
13. Solid waste and wastewater
14. Aviation

EDGAR measures that in 2015, the amount of NMVOCS from the six most contributing sectors (agriculture, power industry, waste, buildings, transport, and other industrial combustion) was 1.2*10^{8} tons. The reported emissions are provided by sector as follows:

NMVOC Emissions by Sector
Sector	NMVOC Emissions (tons)
Agriculture	9,450,016.04
Power Industry	856,907.07
Waste	3,066,094.19
Buildings	24,948,773.51
Transport	32,729,144.19
Other Industrial Combustion	48,505,685.26

Global NMVOC emissions from anthropogenic sources have been increasing over time, with the emissions amount rising from 119,000kt to 169,000kt between 1970 and 2010. Regionally, trends vary, with America and Europe reducing their emissions in the same time period, while Africa and Asia increased their NMVOC emissions in this period. Reductions in emissions from America and Europe are largely attributed to use of greener fuels for transport and changing emissions standards.
