= Smog =

Smoke-like, fog-like air pollutions

External audio
- "Fighting Smog in Los Angeles", Distillations Podcast, 2018 Science History Institute

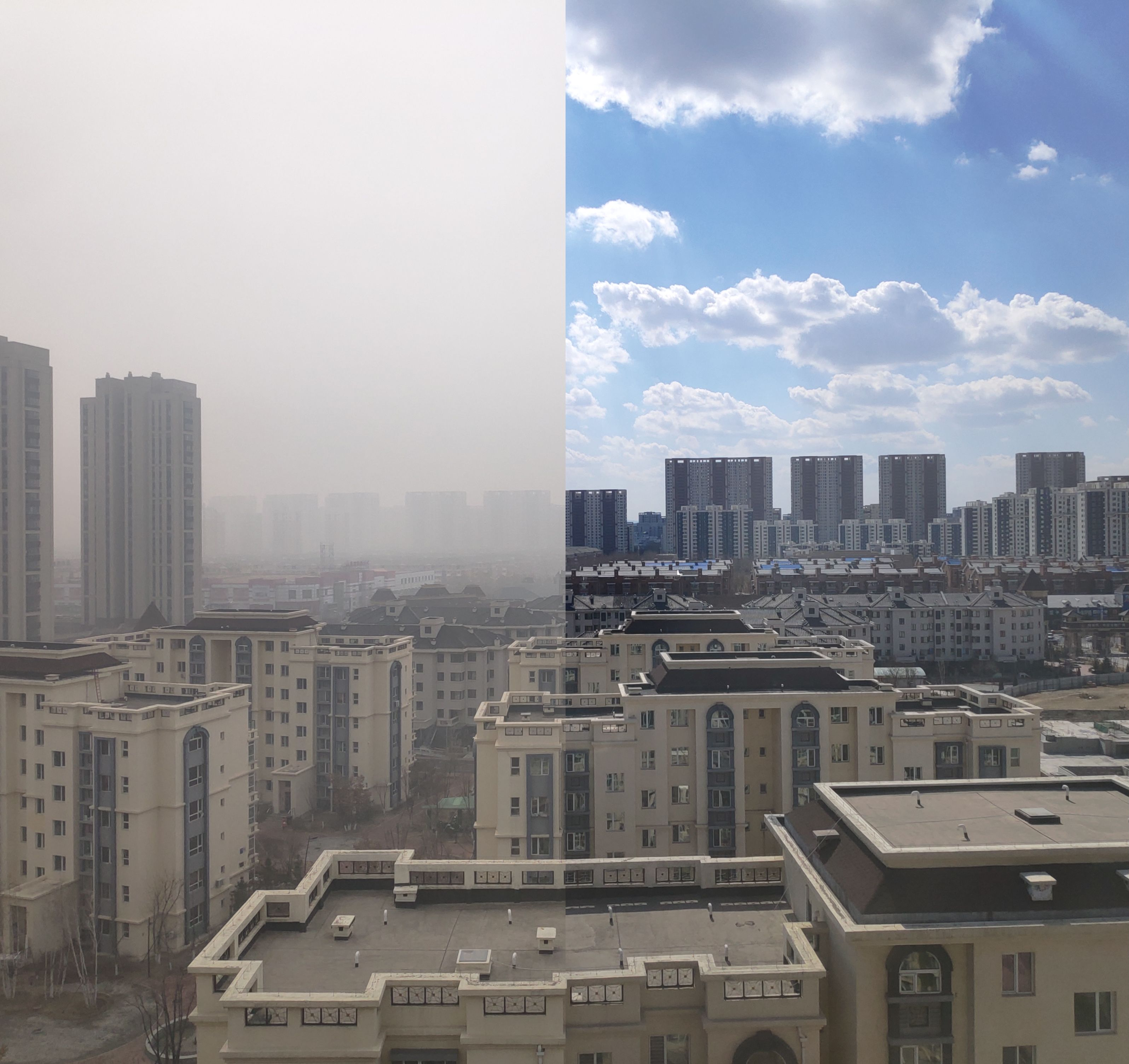
Smoggy and a sunny day within a 10-day interval in Fanhe, China

Smog, or smoke fog, is a type of intense air pollution. The word "smog" was coined in the early 20th century, and is a portmanteau of the words smoke and fog to refer to smoky fog due to its opacity, and odour. The word was then intended to refer to what was sometimes known as pea soup fog, a familiar and serious problem in London from the 19th century to the mid-20th century, where it was commonly known as a London particular or London fog. This kind of visible air pollution is composed of nitrogen oxides, sulfur oxide, ozone, smoke and other particulates. Smog is derived from coal combustion emissions, vehicular emissions, agricultural emissions, industrial emissions, forest fires and the photochemical reaction products of these emissions.

Smog is often categorized as being either summer smog or winter smog. Summer smog is primarily associated with the photochemical formation of ozone. During the summer season when the temperatures are warmer and there is more sunlight present, photochemical smog is the dominant type of smog formation. During the winter months when the temperatures are colder, and atmospheric inversions are common, there is an increase in coal and other fossil fuel usage to heat homes and buildings. These combustion emissions, together with the lack of pollutant dispersion under inversions, characterize winter smog formation. Smog formation in general relies on both primary and secondary pollutants. Primary pollutants are emitted directly from a source, such as emissions of sulfur dioxide from coal combustion. Secondary pollutants, such as ozone, are formed when primary pollutants undergo chemical reactions in the atmosphere.

Photochemical smog, as found for example in Los Angeles, is a type of air pollution derived from vehicular emission from internal combustion engines and industrial fumes. These pollutants react in the atmosphere with sunlight to form secondary pollutants that also combine with the primary emissions to form photochemical smog. In certain other cities, such as Delhi, smog severity is often aggravated by stubble burning in neighboring agricultural areas since the 1980s. The atmospheric pollution levels of Los Angeles, Beijing, Delhi, Lahore, Mexico City, Tehran and other cities are often increased by an inversion that traps pollution close to the ground. The developing smog is toxic to humans and can cause severe sickness, a shortened life span, or premature death.

== Etymology ==
Coinage of the term "smog" has been attributed to Henry Antoine Des Voeux in his 1905 paper, "Fog and Smoke" for a meeting of the Public Health Congress. The 26 July 1905 edition of the London newspaper Daily Graphic quoted Des Voeux, "He said it required no science to see that there was something produced in great cities which was not found in the country, and that was smoky fog, or what was known as 'smog'." The following day the newspaper stated that "Dr. Des Voeux did a public service in coining a new word for the London fog."

However, the term appeared twenty-five years earlier than Voeux's paper, in the Santa Cruz & Monterey Illustrated Handbook published in 1880 and also appears in print in a column quoting from the book in the 3 July 1880, Santa Cruz Weekly Sentinel. On 17 December 1881, in the publication Sporting Times, the author claims to have invented the word: "The 'Smog' – a word I have invented, combined of smoke and fog, to designate the London atmosphere..."

== Anthropogenic causes ==
=== Coal ===
Coal fire can emit significant clouds of smoke that contribute to the formation of winter smog. Coal fires can be used to heat individual buildings or to provide energy in a power-producing plant. Air pollution from this source has been reported in England since the Middle Ages. London, in particular, was notorious up through the mid-20th century for its coal-caused smogs, which were nicknamed "pea-soupers". Air pollution of this type is still a problem in areas that generate significant smoke from burning coal. The emissions from coal combustion are one of the main causes of air pollution in China. Especially during autumn and winter when coal-fired heating ramps up, the amount of produced smoke at times forces some Chinese cities to close down roads, schools or airports. One prominent example for this was China's Northeastern city of Harbin in 2013.

=== Transportation emissions ===
Traffic emissions – such as from trucks, buses, and automobiles – also contribute to the formation of smog. Airborne by-products from vehicle exhaust systems and air conditioning cause air pollution and are a major ingredient in the creation of smog in some large cities.

The major culprits from transportation sources are carbon monoxide (CO), nitrogen oxides (NO and NO_{2}) and volatile organic compounds including hydrocarbons (hydrocarbons are the main component of petroleum fuels such as gasoline and diesel fuel). Transportation emissions also include sulfur dioxides and particulate matter but in much smaller quantities than the pollutants mentioned previously. The nitrogen oxides and volatile organic compounds can undergo a series of chemical reactions with sunlight, heat, ammonia, moisture, and other compounds to form the noxious vapors, ground level ozone, and particles that comprise smog.

== Photochemical smog ==
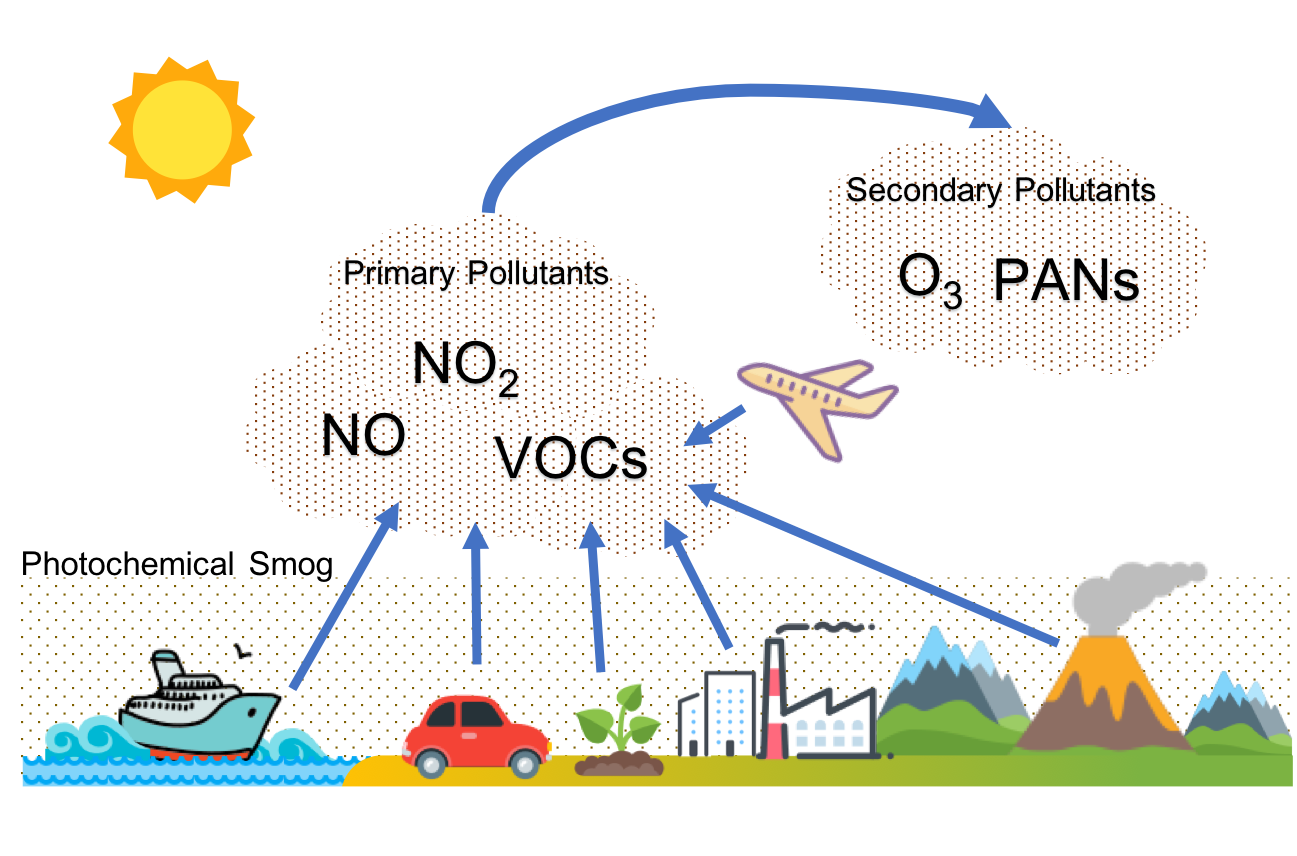
Photochemical smog formation

Photochemical smog, often referred to as "summer smog", is the chemical reaction of sunlight, nitrogen oxides and volatile organic compounds in the atmosphere, which leaves airborne particles and ground-level ozone. Photochemical smog depends on primary pollutants as well as the formation of secondary pollutants. These primary pollutants include nitrogen oxides, particularly nitric oxide (NO) and nitrogen dioxide (NO_{2}), and volatile organic compounds. The relevant secondary pollutants include peroxyacetyl nitrates (PANs), tropospheric ozone, and aldehydes. An important secondary pollutant for photochemical smog is ozone, which is formed when hydrocarbons (HC) and nitrogen oxides (NO_{x}) combine in the presence of sunlight; nitrogen dioxide (NO_{2}), which is formed as nitric oxide (NO) combines with oxygen (O_{2}) in the air.

In addition, when SO_{2} and NO_{x} are emitted they eventually are oxidized in the troposphere to nitric acid and sulfuric acid, which, when mixed with water, form the main components of acid rain. All of these harsh chemicals are usually highly reactive and oxidizing. Photochemical smog is therefore considered to be a problem of modern industrialization. It is present in all modern cities, but it is more common in cities with sunny, warm, dry climates and a large number of motor vehicles. Because it travels with the wind, it can affect sparsely populated areas as well.

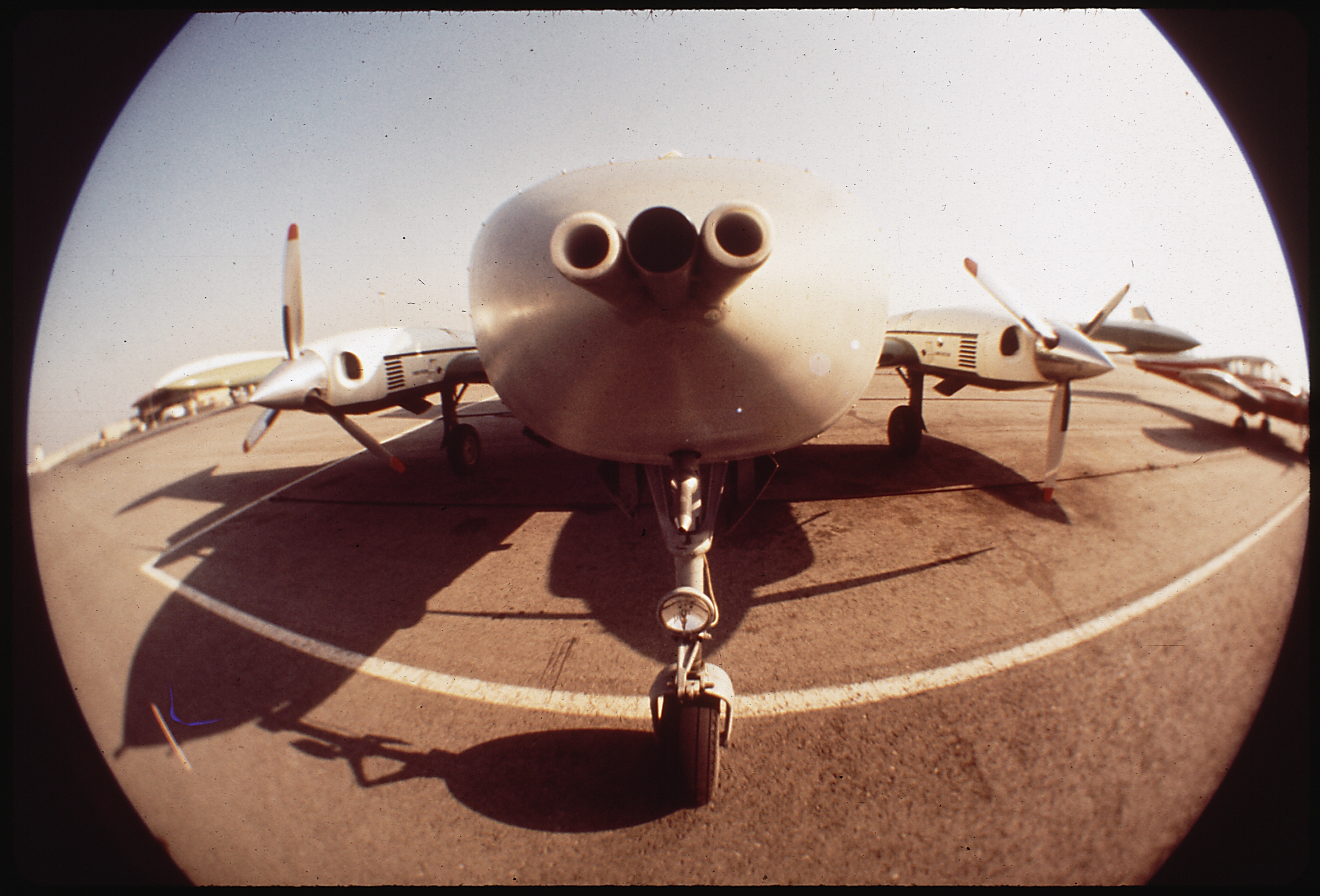
Airplane used to collect airborne hydrocarbons, May 1972

The composition and chemical reactions involved in photochemical smog were not understood until the 1950s. In 1948, flavor chemist Arie Haagen-Smit adapted some of his equipment to collect chemicals from polluted air, and identified ozone as a component of Los Angeles smog. Haagen-Smit went on to discover that nitrogen oxides from automotive exhausts and gaseous hydrocarbons from cars and oil refineries, exposed to sunlight, were key ingredients in the formation of ozone and photochemical smog. Haagen-Smit worked with Arnold Beckman, who developed various equipment for detecting smog, ranging from an "Apparatus for recording gas concentrations in the atmosphere" patented on 7 October 1952, to "air quality monitoring vans" for use by government and industry.

=== Formation and reactions ===
Photochemical smog forms through a series of sunlight-driven reactions: nitrogen dioxide (NO₂) absorbs solar radiation and splits into nitric oxide (NO) and a free oxygen atom, which then combines with molecular oxygen (O₂) to form ozone (O₃). Volatile organic compounds (VOCs) participate by reacting with NO, preventing the removal of ozone and allowing its concentration to build up alongside other secondary oxidants such as peroxyacetyl nitrates (PANs).

In addition to ozone, photochemical smog contains other harmful secondary pollutants. Peroxyacetyl nitrates (PANs) are potent eye and respiratory irritants formed when VOC oxidation leads to peroxy radicals that react with NO₂. Aldehydes such as formaldehyde also arise during VOC oxidation, contributing to irritation and odors associated with smog episodes.

During the morning rush hour, a high concentration of nitric oxide and hydrocarbons are emitted to the atmosphere, mostly via on-road traffic but also from industrial sources. Some hydrocarbons are rapidly oxidized by OH· and form peroxy radicals, which convert nitric oxide (NO) to nitrogen dioxide (NO_{2}).

1. R• + O_{2} + M → RO_{2}• + M
2. RO_{2}• + NO → NO_{2} + RO•
3. HO_{2}• + NO → NO_{2} + OH•

Nitrogen dioxide (NO_{2}) and nitric oxide (NO) further react with ozone (O_{3}) in a series of chemical reactions:

4. NO_{2} + hν → O(^{3}P) + NO λ < 400 nm
5. O(^{3}P) + O_{2} + M → O_{3} + M(heat)
6. O_{3} + NO → NO_{2} + O_{2}

This series of equations is referred to as the photostationary state (PSS). However, because of the presence of Reaction 2 and 3, NO_{x} and ozone are not in a perfectly steady state. By replacing Reaction 6 with Reaction 2 and Reaction 3, the O_{3} molecule is no longer destroyed. Therefore, the concentration of ozone keeps increasing throughout the day. This mechanism can escalate the formation of ozone in smog. Other reactions such as the photooxidation of formaldehyde (HCHO), a common secondary pollutant, can also contribute to the increased concentration of ozone and NO_{2}. Photochemical smog is more prevalent during summer days since incident solar radiation fluxes are high, which favors the formation of ozone (reactions 4 and 5). The presence of a temperature inversion layer is another important factor. That is because it prevents the vertical convective mixing of the air and thus allows the pollutants, including ozone, to accumulate near the ground level, which again favors the formation of photochemical smog.

There are certain reactions that can limit the formation of O_{3} in smog. The main limiting reaction in polluted areas is:

7. NO_{2} + HO• + M → HNO_{3} + M

This reaction removes NO_{2} which limits the amount of O_{3} that can be produced from its photolysis (reaction 4). HNO_{3}, nitric acid, is a sticky compound that can easily be removed onto surfaces (dry deposition) or dissolved in water and be rained out (wet deposition). Both ways are common in the atmosphere and can efficiently remove radicals and nitrogen dioxide.

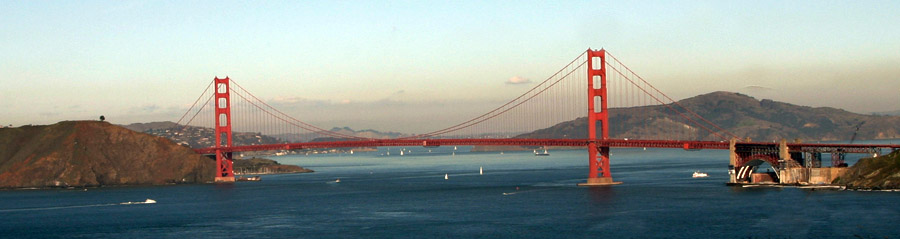
Photochemical smog in California near the Golden Gate Bridge in December 2003. The brown coloration is due to the NO_{2} formed from photochemical smog reactions.

=== Natural causes ===
==== Volcanoes ====
An erupting volcano can emit high levels of sulfur dioxide along with a large quantity of particulate matter; two key components to the creation of smog. However, the smog created as a result of a volcanic eruption is often known as vog to distinguish it as a natural occurrence. The chemical reactions that form smog following a volcanic eruption are different than the reactions that form photochemical smog. The term smog encompasses the effect when a large number of gas-phase molecules and particulate matter are emitted to the atmosphere, creating a visible haze. The event causing a large number of emissions can vary but still result in the formation of smog.

==== Plants ====
Plants are a natural source of hydrocarbons that can undergo reactions in the atmosphere and produce smog. Globally both plants and soil contribute a substantial amount to the production of hydrocarbons, mainly by producing isoprene and terpenes. Hydrocarbons released by plants can often be more reactive than man-made hydrocarbons. For example when plants release isoprene, the isoprene reacts very quickly in the atmosphere with hydroxyl radicals. These reactions produce hydroperoxides which increase ozone formation.

== Health effects ==
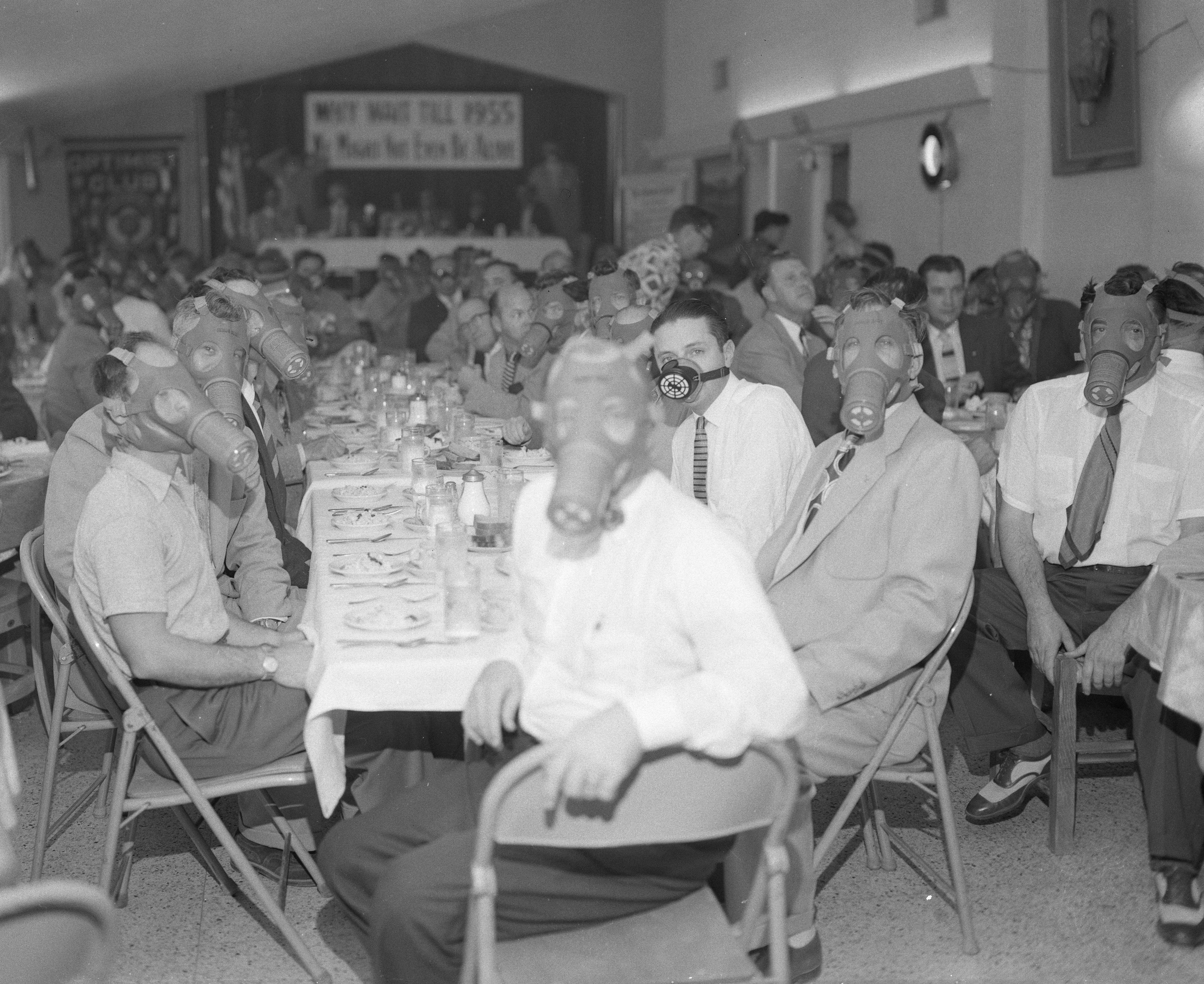
Highland Park Optimist Club wearing smog-gas masks at banquet, Los Angeles, circa 1954

Smog is a serious problem in many cities and continues to harm human health. Secondary pollutants produced in photochemical smog such as ozone, PANs, and aldehydes contribute to respiratory irritation, eye irritation, and reduced lung function, particularly among sensitive populations. Ground-level ozone, sulfur dioxide, nitrogen dioxide and carbon monoxide are especially harmful for senior citizens, children, and people with heart and lung conditions such as emphysema, bronchitis, and asthma.

It can inflame breathing passages, decrease the lungs' working capacity, cause shortness of breath, pain when inhaling deeply, wheezing, and coughing. It can cause eye and nose irritation and it dries out the protective membranes of the nose and throat and interferes with the body's ability to fight infection, increasing susceptibility to illness. Hospital admissions and respiratory deaths often increase during periods when ozone levels are high.

There is a lack of knowledge on the long-term effects of air pollution exposure and the origin of asthma. An experiment was carried out using intense air pollution similar to that of the 1952 Great Smog of London. The results from this experiment concluded that there is a link between early-life pollution exposure that leads to the development of asthma, proposing the ongoing effect of the Great Smog.

Modern studies continue to find links between mortality and the presence of smog. One study, published in Nature magazine, found that smog episodes in the city of Jinan, a large city in eastern China, during 2011–15, were associated with a 5.87% (95% CI 0.16–11.58%) increase in the rate of overall mortality. This study highlights the effect of exposure to air pollution on the rate of mortality in China. A similar study in Xi'an found an association between ambient air pollution and increased mortality associated with respiratory diseases.

=== Levels of unhealthy exposure ===
The U.S. EPA has developed an air quality index to help explain air pollution levels to the general public. 8 hour average ozone concentrations of 85 to 104 ppbv are described as "Unhealthy for Sensitive Groups", 105 ppbv to 124 ppbv as "unhealthy" and 125 ppb to 404 ppb as "very unhealthy". The "very unhealthy" range for some other pollutants are: 355 μg m^{−3} – 424 μg m^{−3} for PM10; 15.5 ppm – 30.4ppm for CO and 0.65 ppm – 1.24 ppm for NO_{2}.

=== Premature deaths due to cancer and respiratory disease ===
In 2016, the Ontario Medical Association announced that smog is responsible for an estimated 9,500 premature deaths in the province each year. A 20-year American Cancer Society study found that cumulative exposure also increases the likelihood of premature death from respiratory disease, implying the 8-hour standard may be insufficient.

=== Alzheimer risk ===
Tiny magnetic particles from air pollution have for the first time been discovered to be lodged in human brains– and researchers think they could be a possible cause of Alzheimer's disease. Researchers at Lancaster University found abundant magnetite nanoparticles in brain tissue from 37 individuals aged three to 92-years-old who lived in Mexico City and Manchester. This strongly magnetic mineral is toxic and has been implicated in the production of reactive oxygen species (free radicals) in the human brain, which is associated with neurodegenerative diseases including Alzheimer's disease.

=== Risk of certain birth defects ===
A study examining 806 women who had babies with birth defects between 1997 and 2006, and 849 women who had healthy babies, found that smog in the San Joaquin Valley area of California was linked to two types of neural tube defects: spina bifida (a condition involving, among other manifestations, certain malformations of the spinal column), and anencephaly (the underdevelopment or absence of part or all of the brain, which if not fatal usually results in profound impairment). An emerging cohort study in China linked early-life smog exposure to an increased risk for adverse pregnancy outcomes, in particular oxidative stress.

=== Low birth weight ===
According to a study published in The Lancet, even a very small (5 μg) change in PM2.5 exposure was associated with an increase (18%) in risk of a low birth weight at delivery, and this relationship held even below the current accepted safe levels.

== Other negative effects ==
Although severe health effects caused by smog are the chief issue, intense air pollution caused by haze from air pollution, dust storm particles, and bush fire smoke, cause a reduction in irradiance that negatively affects both solar photovoltaic production as well as agricultural yield.

== Areas affected ==
Smog can form in almost any climate where industries or cities release large amounts of air pollution, such as smoke or gases. Precursors of photochemical smog can be transported downwind from urban centers, allowing smog formation in suburban and rural areas as pollutants react over time during transport. This means that smog episodes can affect regions far from the original emission sources. However, it is worse during periods of warmer, sunnier weather when the upper air is warm enough to inhibit vertical circulation. It is especially prevalent in geologic basins encircled by hills or mountains. It often stays for an extended period of time over densely populated cities or urban areas and can build up to dangerous levels.

=== Asia ===
==== India ====
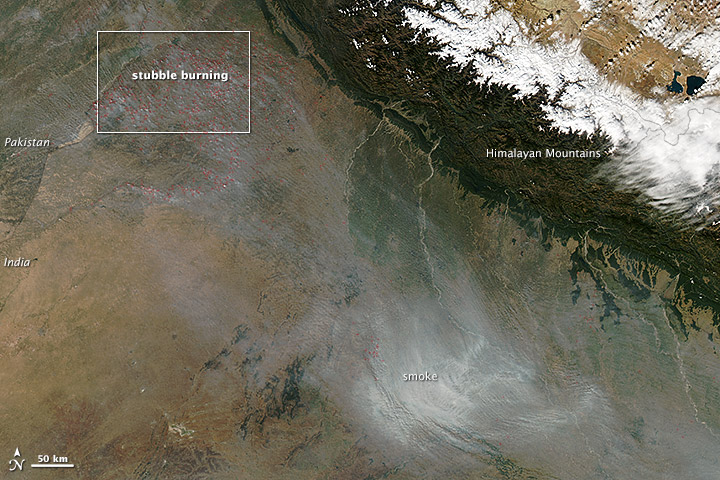
During the autumn and spring months, some 500 million tons of rice and wheat crop residues are burnt, and winds blow from India's north and northwest towards east. This aerial view shows India's annual crop burning, resulting in smoke and air pollution over Delhi and adjoining areas.

For the past few years, cities in northern India have been covered in a thick layer of winter smog. The situation has turned severe in the national capital, Delhi. This smog is caused by the collection of particulate matter (a very fine type of dust and toxic gases) in the air due to stagnant movement of air during winters. Moreover, during the post-monsoon to winter transition, air quality in the Indo-Gangetic Plain (IGP) worsens significantly due to shifts in weather patterns, such as changes in wind, temperature, and boundary layer mixing. The impact of emissions from both biomass burning and urban activities has intensified, leading to a rise in aerosols mainly particulate matters. The nearby Himalayan region is also affected, where mountainous topography trap air pollutants and increase the air quality issues specifically in northern India.

Delhi is the most polluted city in the world and according to one estimate, air pollution causes the death of about 10,500 people in Delhi every year. During 2013–14, peak levels of fine particulate matter (PM) in Delhi increased by about 44%, primarily due to high vehicular and industrial emissions, construction work and crop burning in adjoining states.

Delhi has the highest level of the airborne particulate matter, PM2.5 considered most harmful to health, with 153 micrograms. Rising air pollution level has significantly increased lung-related ailments (especially asthma and lung cancer) among Delhi's children and women. The dense smog in Delhi during winter season results in major air and rail traffic disruptions every year. According to Indian meteorologists, the average maximum temperature in Delhi during winters has declined notably since 1998 due to rising air pollution.

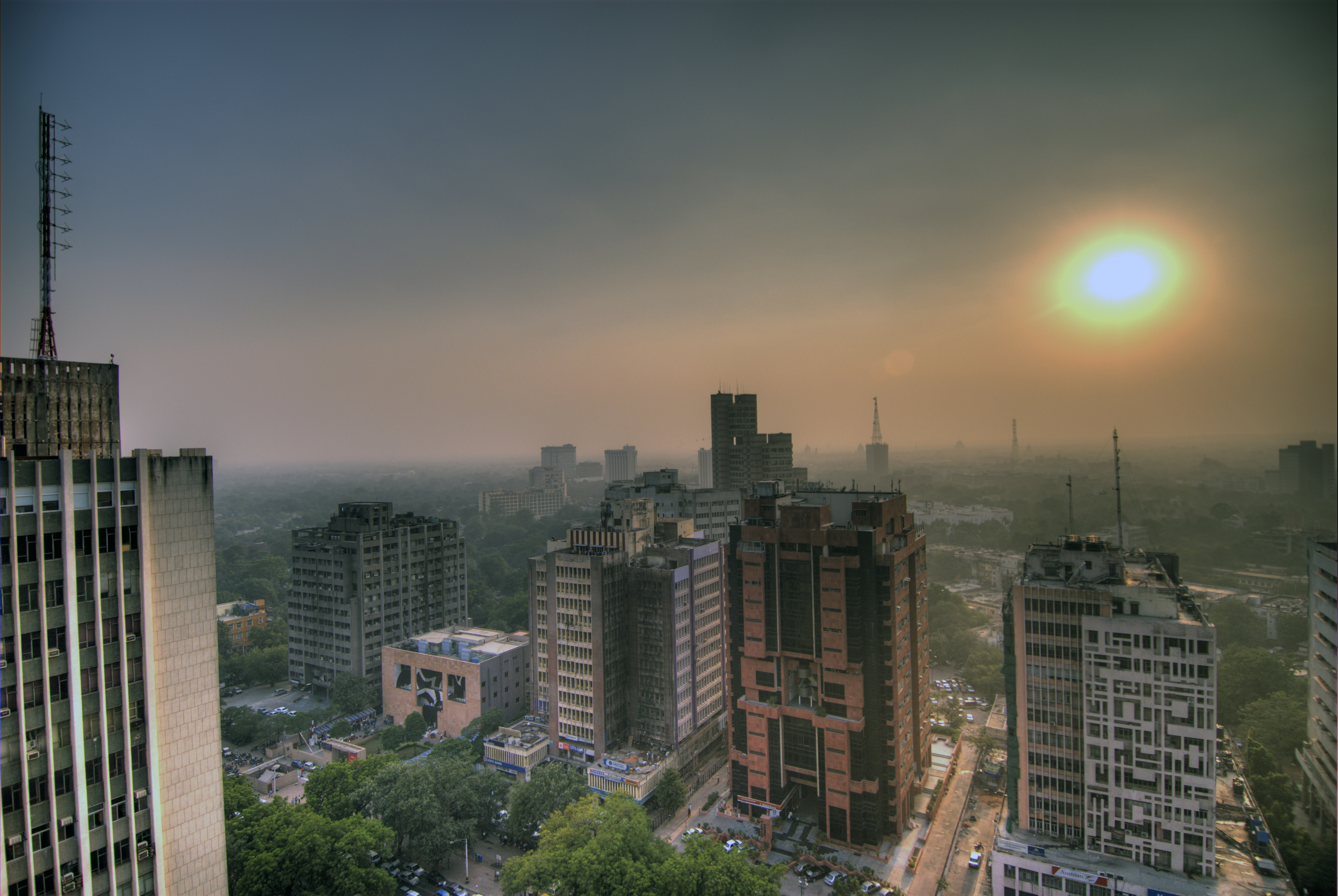
Dense smog blankets Connaught Place, New Delhi

Environmentalists have criticized the Delhi government for not doing enough to curb air pollution and to inform people about air quality issues. Most of Delhi's residents are unaware of alarming levels of air pollution in the city and the health risks associated with it. Since the mid-1990s, Delhi has undertaken some measures to curb air pollution – Delhi has the third highest quantity of trees among Indian cities – and the Delhi Transport Corporation operates the world's largest fleet of environmentally friendly compressed natural gas (CNG) buses.

In 1996, the Centre for Science and Environment (CSE) started a public interest litigation in the Supreme Court of India that ordered the conversion of Delhi's fleet of buses and taxis to run on CNG and banned the use of leaded petrol in 1998. In 2003, Delhi won the United States Department of Energy's first 'Clean Cities International Partner of the Year' award for its "bold efforts to curb air pollution and support alternative fuel initiatives". The Delhi Metro has also been credited for significantly reducing air pollutants in the city.

However, according to several authors, most of these gains have been lost, especially due to stubble burning, rise in market share of diesel cars and a considerable decline in bus ridership. According to CUE and System of Air Quality Weather Forecasting and Research (SAFER), burning of agricultural waste in nearby Punjab, Haryana and Uttar Pradesh regions results in severe intensification of smog over Delhi. The state government of adjoining Uttar Pradesh is considering imposing a ban on crop burning to reduce pollution in Delhi NCR and an environmental panel has appealed to India's Supreme Court to impose a 30% cess on diesel cars.

==== China ====
Joint research between American and Chinese researchers in 2006 concluded that much of Beijing's pollution comes from surrounding cities and provinces. On average 35–60% of the ozone can be traced to sources outside the city. Shandong Province and Tianjin Municipality have a "significant influence on Beijing's air quality", partly due to the prevailing south/southeasterly flow during the summer and the mountains to the north and northwest.

==== Iran ====
In December 2005, schools and public offices were forced to close in Tehran and 1,600 people were taken to hospital, in a severe smog blamed largely on unfiltered car exhaust.

Kyrgyzstan

The capital of Kyrgyzstan is severely affected by smog and ranks among the 10 worst air polluted cities in the world. In the winter 2020-21, air pollution levels exceeded the marker of 100 PM2.5 for ‘moderate air quality during 25 days in December 2020 and 25 days in January 2021, while on some days reaching the average of 200-300 PM2.5 - a degree of air pollution extremely detrimental to health. Coal heating, lack of air circulation and exhaust emissions of private vehicles are identified as the main causes. Smog is hereby directly tied to an unchecked construction of luxurious high-rise building (so called elitki) which obstruct the flow of fresh mountain air that historically had helped ventilate the city.

==== Mongolia ====
In the late 1990s, massive immigration to Ulaanbaatar from the countryside began. An estimated 150,000 households, mainly living in traditional Mongolian gers on the outskirts of Ulaanbaatar, burn wood and coal (some poor families burn car tires and trash) to heat themselves during the harsh winter, which lasts from October to April, since these outskirts are not connected to the city's central heating system. A temporary solution to decrease smog was proposed in the form of stoves with improved efficiency, although with no visible results.

Coal-fired ger stoves release high levels of ash and other particulate matter (PM). When inhaled, these particles can settle in the lungs and respiratory tract and cause health problems. At 2 to 10 times above Mongolian and international air quality standards, Ulaanbaatar's PM rates are among the worst in the world, according to a December 2009 World Bank report. The Asian Development Bank (ADB) estimates that health costs related to this air pollution account for as much as 4 percent of Mongolia's GDP.

==== Southeast Asia ====
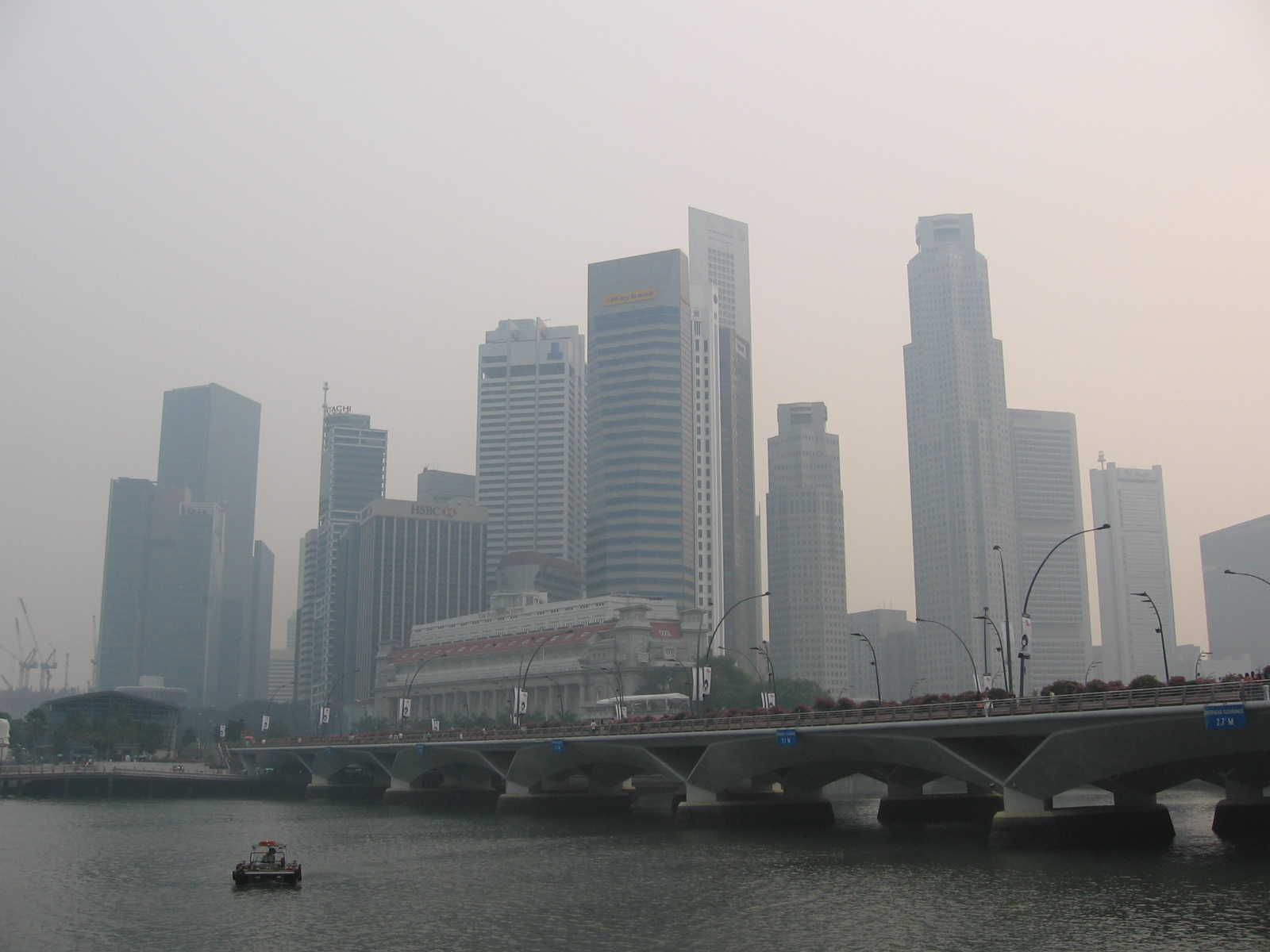
Singapore's Downtown Core on 7 October 2006, when it was affected by forest fires in Sumatra, Indonesia

Smog is a regular problem in Southeast Asia caused by land and forest fires in Indonesia, especially Sumatra and Kalimantan, although the term haze is preferred in describing the problem. Farmers and plantation owners are usually the cause of the fires, which they use to clear tracts of land for further plantings. These fires mainly affect Brunei, Indonesia, Philippines, Malaysia, Singapore and Thailand, and occasionally Guam and Saipan. The economic losses of the fires in 1997 have been estimated at more than US$9 billion.

This includes damages in agriculture production, destruction of forest lands, health, transportation, tourism, and other economic endeavours. Not included are social, environmental, and psychological problems and long-term health effects. The second-latest bout of haze to occur in Malaysia, Singapore and the Malacca Straits was in October 2006, and was caused by smoke from fires in Indonesia being blown across the Straits of Malacca by southwesterly winds. A similar haze occurred in June 2013, with the PSI setting a new record in Singapore on 21 June at 12pm with a reading of 401, which is in the "Hazardous" range.

The Association of Southeast Asian Nations (ASEAN) reacted. In 2002, the Agreement on Transboundary Haze Pollution was signed between all ASEAN nations. ASEAN formed a Regional Haze Action Plan (RHAP) and established a co-ordination and support unit (CSU). RHAP, with the help of Canada, established a monitoring and warning system for forest/vegetation fires and implemented a Fire Danger Rating System (FDRS). The Malaysian Meteorological Department (MMD) has issued a daily rating of fire danger since September 2003. Indonesia has been ineffective at enforcing legal policies on deviant farmers.

==== Pakistan ====
Since the start of the winter season, heavy smog loaded with pollutants covered major parts of Punjab, especially the city of Lahore, causing breathing problems and disrupting normal traffic. A recent study from 2022 shows that the primary cause of pollution in Lahore is from traffic-related PM (both exhausts and non exhaust sources). Air quality in the Punjab, Pakistan deteriorates markedly during the post-monsoon to winter transition, driven by shifts in weather patterns like alterations in wind, temperature, and boundary layer mixing. In post-moonsoon, anthropogenic emissions from sources like vehicle exhaust, industrial activities, and crop burning impact air quality across Punjab, Pakistan, affecting the region by 90–100%.

Doctors advised residents to stay indoors and wear facemasks outside.

=== United Kingdom ===
==== London ====
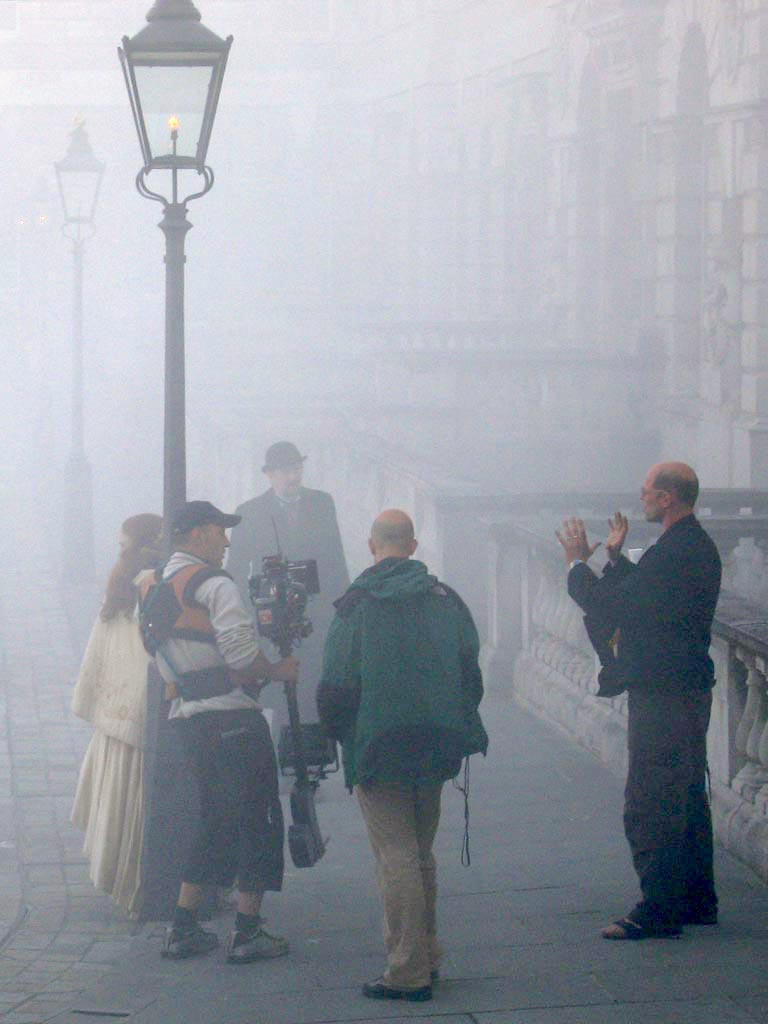
Victorian London was notorious for its thick smogs, or "pea-soupers", a fact that is often recreated (as here) to add an air of mystery to a period costume drama

In 1306, concerns over air pollution were sufficient for Edward I to (briefly) ban coal fires in London. In 1661, John Evelyn's Fumifugium suggested burning fragrant wood instead of mineral coal, which he believed would reduce coughing. The "Ballad of Gresham College" the same year describes how the smoke "does our lungs and spirits choke, Our hanging spoil, and rust our iron."

Severe episodes of smog continued in the 19th and 20th centuries, mainly in the winter, and were nicknamed "pea-soupers," from the phrase "as thick as pea soup". The Great Smog of 1952 darkened the streets of London and killed approximately 4,000 people in the short time of four days (a further 8,000 died from its effects in the following weeks and months). Initially, a flu epidemic was blamed for the loss of life.

In 1956 the Clean Air Act started legally enforcing smokeless zones in the capital. There were areas where no soft coal was allowed to be burned in homes or in businesses, only coke, which produces no smoke. Because of the smokeless zones, reduced levels of sooty particulates eliminated the intense and persistent London smog.

It was after this that the great clean-up of London began. One by one, historical buildings which, during the previous two centuries had gradually completely blackened externally, had their stone facades cleaned and restored to their original appearance. Victorian buildings whose appearance changed dramatically after cleaning included the British Museum of Natural History. A more recent example was the Palace of Westminster, which was cleaned in the 1980s. A notable exception to the restoration trend was 10 Downing Street, whose bricks upon cleaning in the late 1950s proved to be naturally yellow; the smog-blackened color of the façade was considered so iconic that the bricks were painted black to preserve the image.

==== Other areas ====
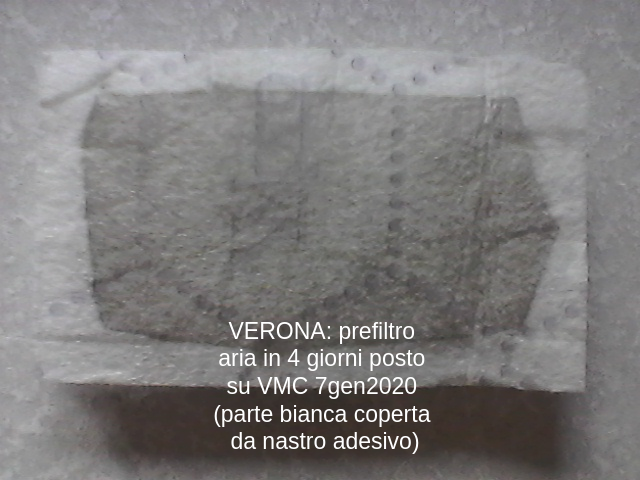
Grease filter hood after 4 days in an Italian city with polluted air in winter (whole surface was previously white)

Other areas of the United Kingdom were affected by smog, especially heavily industrialised areas. The cities of Glasgow and Edinburgh, in Scotland, suffered smoke-laden fogs in 1909. Des Voeux, commonly credited with creating the "smog" moniker, presented a paper in 1911 to the Manchester Conference of the Smoke Abatement League of Great Britain about the fogs and resulting deaths. One Birmingham resident described near black-out conditions in the 1900s before the Clean Air Act, with visibility so poor that cyclists had to dismount and walk to stay on the road. On 29 April 2015, the UK Supreme Court ruled that the government must take immediate action to cut air pollution, following a case brought by environmental lawyers at ClientEarth.

=== Latin America ===
==== Mexico ====
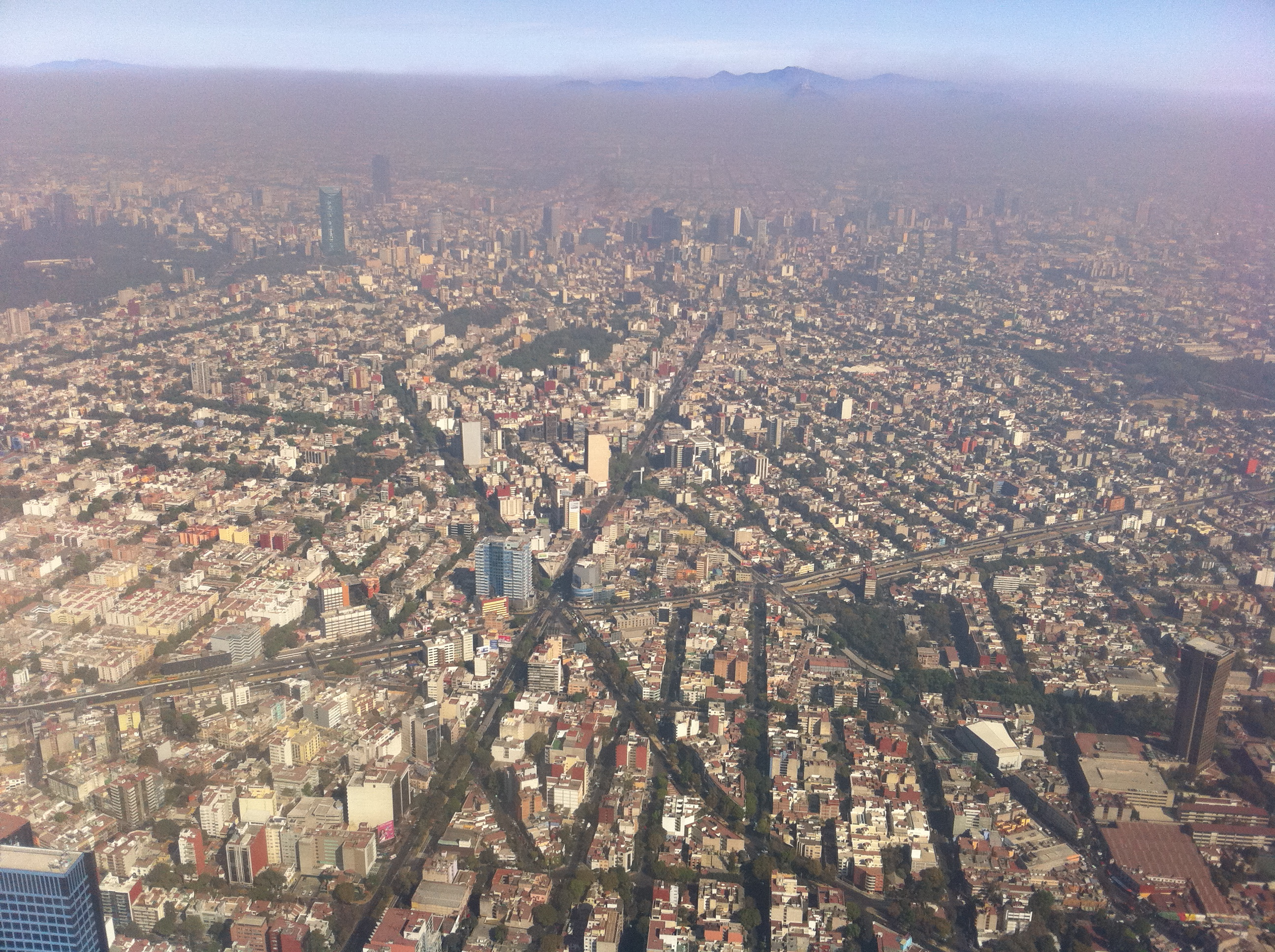
Situated in a valley, and relying heavily on automobiles, Mexico City often suffers from poor air quality.

Due to its location in a highland "bowl", cold air sinks down onto the urban area of Mexico City, trapping industrial and vehicle pollution underneath, and turning it into the most smog-plagued city of Latin America. From the 1950s, Mexico's air quality experienced a rapid decline, with pollutants like nitrogen dioxide being double or triple the international standards.

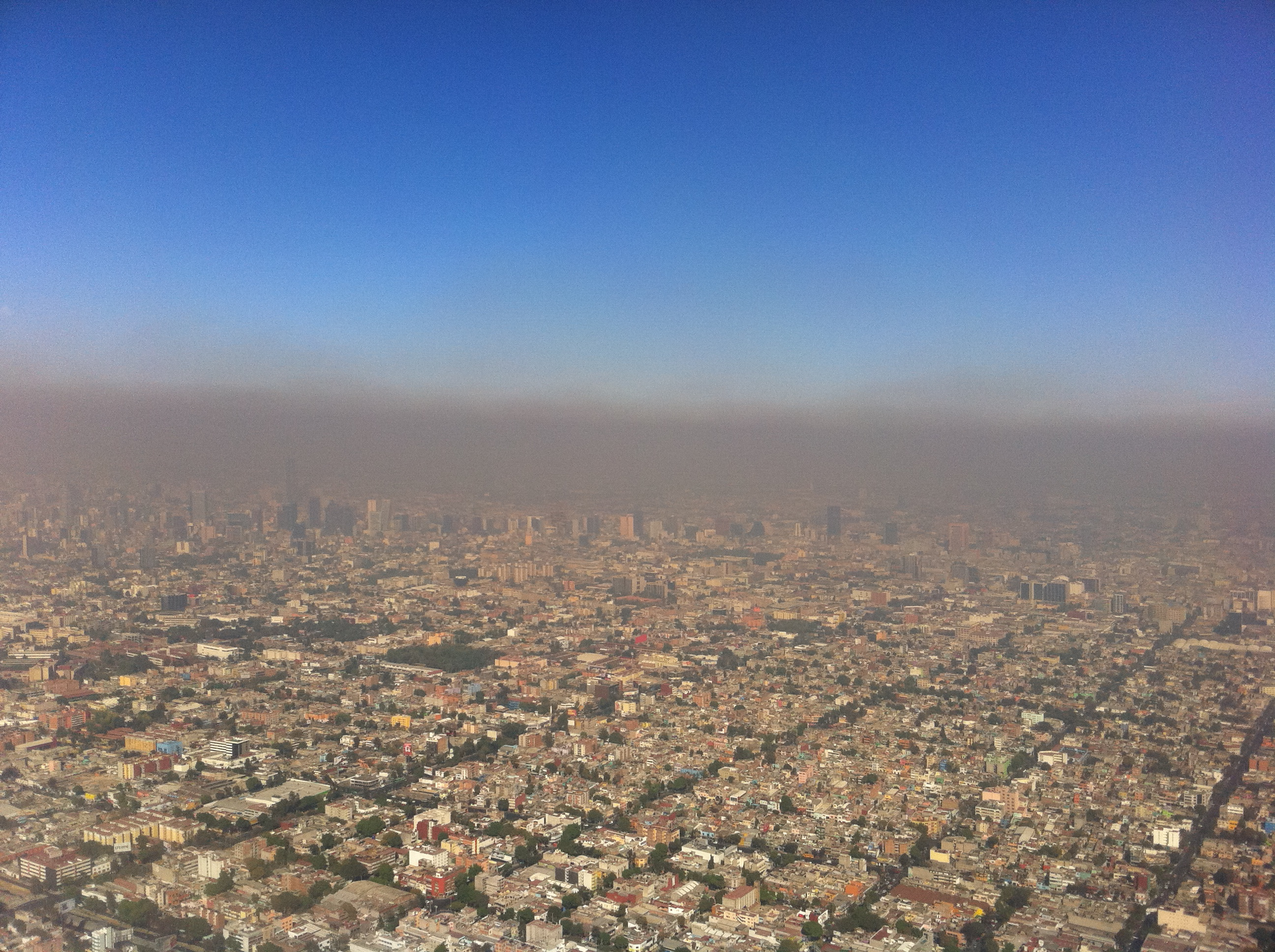
Photochemical smog over Mexico City, December 2010

==== Chile ====
Similar to Mexico City, air pollution is easily trapped in the Santiago valley in Chile, located between the Andes and the Chilean Coast Range, making the city the most smog-plagued in South America. The city's high latitude (31 degrees south) and dry weather during most of the year contribute to the problem.

=== North America ===
==== Canada ====
According to the Canadian Science Smog Assessment published in 2012, smog is responsible for detrimental effects on human and ecosystem health, as well as socioeconomic wellbeing across the country. It was estimated that the province of Ontario sustains $201 million in damages annually for selected crops, and an estimated tourism revenue degradation of $7.5 million in Vancouver and $1.32 million in The Fraser Valley due to decreased visibility. Air pollution in British Columbia is of particular concern, especially in the Fraser Valley, because of a meteorological effect called inversion which decreases air dispersion and leads to greater smog concentration.

==== United States ====
Though the rate of exposure to ground-level ozone ("smog") and small-particulate matter ("soot") has been declining, in 2026, nearly half of people in the US under age 18 live in an area receiving a failing grade for at least one measure of air pollution.

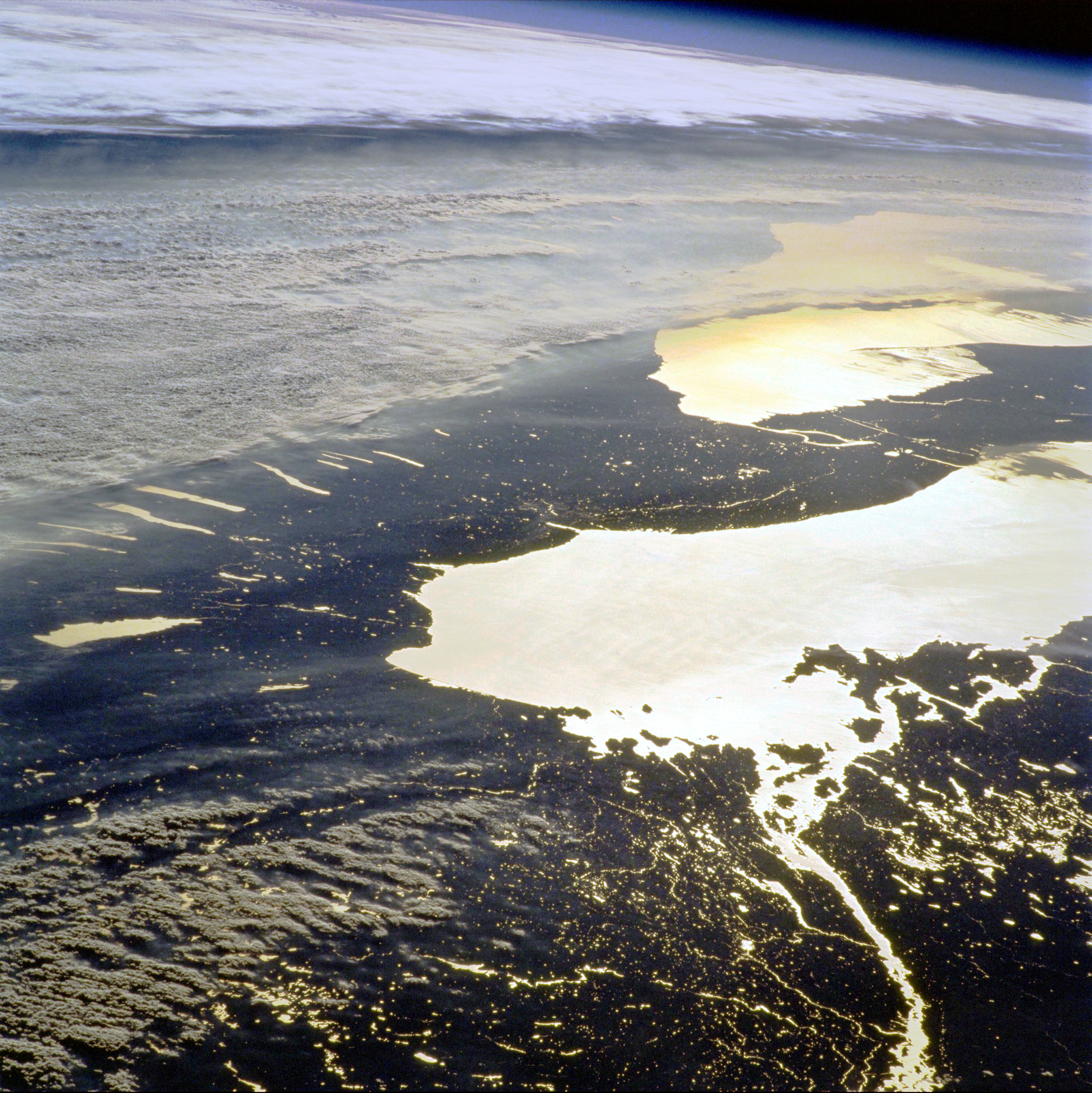
A NASA astronaut's photograph of a smog layer over central New York

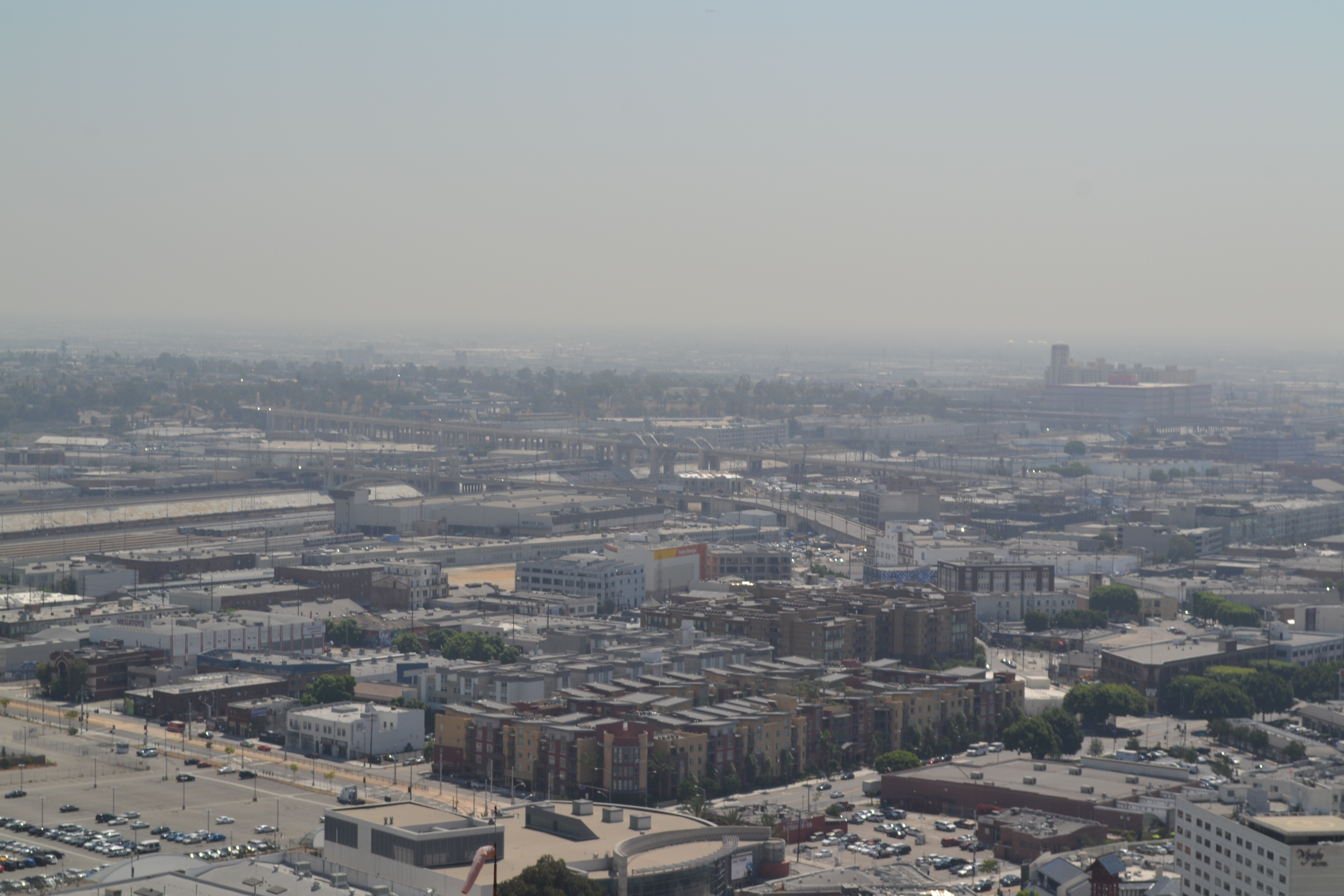
View of smog south from Los Angeles City Hall, September 2011

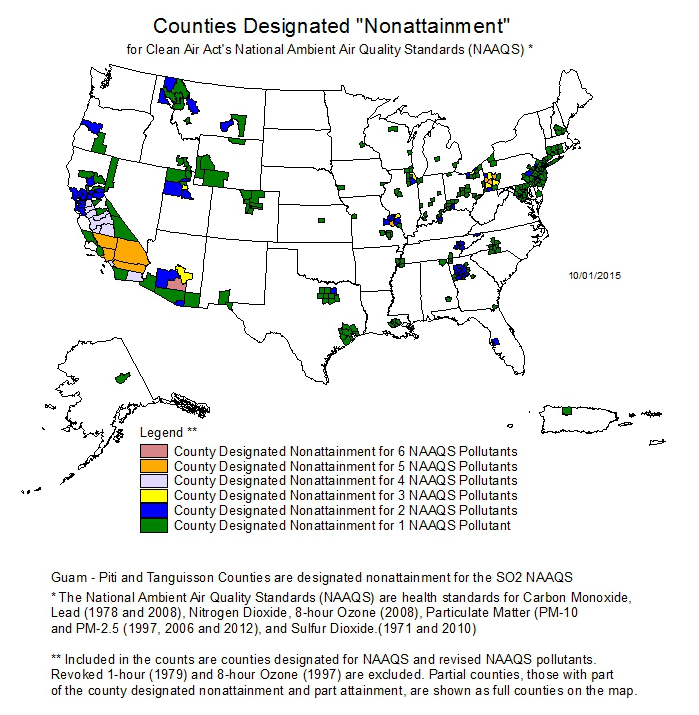
Counties in the United States where one or more National Ambient Air Quality Standards are not met, as of October 2015

Smog was brought to the attention of the general U.S. public in 1933 with the publication of the book "Stop That Smoke", by Henry Obermeyer, a New York public utility official, in which he pointed out the effect on human life and even the destruction of 3,000 acres (12 km^{2}) of a farmer's spinach crop. Since then, the United States Environmental Protection Agency has designated over 300 U.S. counties to be non-attainment areas for one or more pollutants tracked as part of the National Ambient Air Quality Standards.

These areas are largely clustered around large metropolitan areas, with the largest contiguous non-attainment zones in California and the Northeast. Various U.S. and Canadian government agencies collaborate to produce real-time air quality maps and forecasts. To combat smog conditions, localities may declare "smog alert" days, such as in the Spare the Air program in the San Francisco Bay Area. By 1970, Congress enacted the Clean Air Act to regulate air pollutant emissions.

In the United States, smog pollution kills 24,000 Americans every year. The U.S. is among the more polluted countries in terms of smog, ranked 123 out of 195 countries measured, where 1 is cleanest and 195 is most smog polluted.

===== Los Angeles and the San Joaquin Valley =====
Because of their locations in low basins surrounded by mountains, Los Angeles and the San Joaquin Valley are notorious for their smog. Heavy automobile traffic, combined with the additional effects of the San Francisco Bay and Los Angeles/Long Beach port complexes, frequently contribute to further air pollution.

Los Angeles, in particular, is strongly predisposed to the accumulation of smog, because of the peculiarities of its geography and weather patterns. Los Angeles is situated in a flat basin with the ocean on one side and mountain ranges on three sides. A nearby cold ocean current depresses surface air temperatures in the area, resulting in an inversion layer: a phenomenon where air temperature increases, instead of decreasing, with altitude, suppressing thermals and restricting vertical convection. All taken together, this results in a relatively thin, enclosed layer of air above the city that cannot easily escape out of the basin and tends to accumulate pollution.

Los Angeles was one of the best-known cities suffering from transportation smog for much of the 20th century, so much so that it was sometimes said that Los Angeles was a synonym for smog. In 1970, when the Clean Air Act was passed, Los Angeles was the most polluted basin in the country, and California was unable to create a State Implementation Plan that would enable it to meet the new air quality standards. However, ensuing strict regulations by state and federal government agencies overseeing this problem (such as the California Air Resources Board and the United States Environmental Protection Agency), including tight restrictions on allowed emissions levels for all new cars sold in California and mandatory regular emission tests of older vehicles, resulted in significant improvements in air quality. For example, air concentrations of volatile organic compounds declined by a factor of 50 between 1962 and 2012. Concentrations of air pollutants such as nitrous oxides and ozone declined by 70% to 80% over the same period of time.

===== Major incidents in the U.S. =====
- 26 July 1943, Los Angeles, California: A smog so sudden and severe that "Los Angeles residents believed the Japanese were attacking them with chemical warfare."
- 30-31 October 1948, Donora, Pennsylvania: 20 died, 600 hospitalized, thousands more stricken. Lawsuits were not settled until 1951.
- 24 November 1966, New York City, New York: Smog kills at least 169 people.

== Pollution index ==
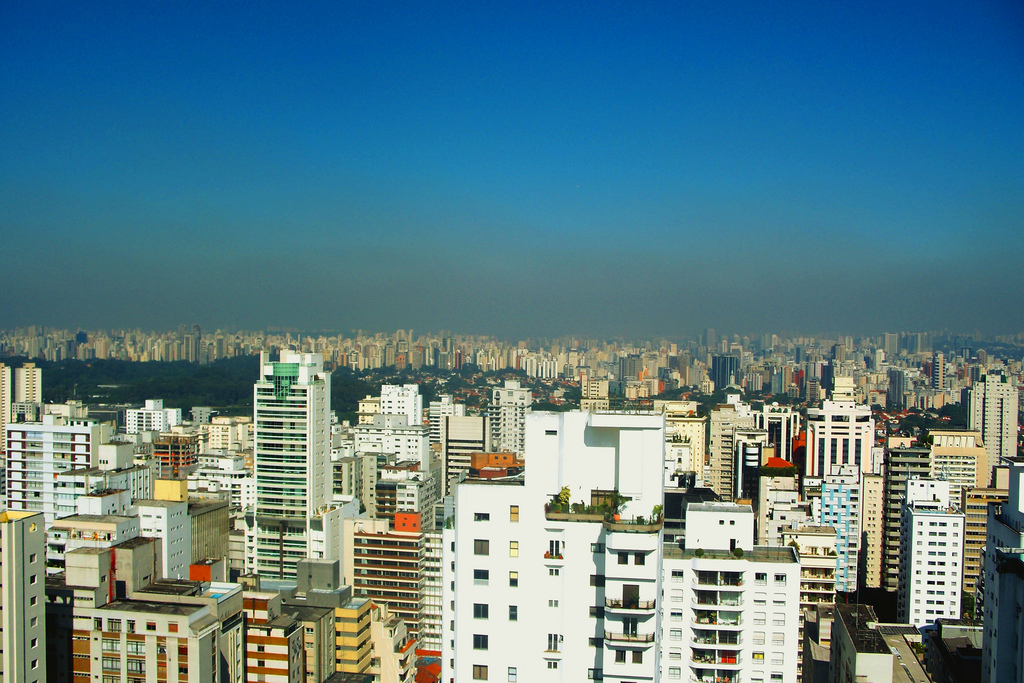
Smog in São Paulo, Brazil

The severity of smog is often measured using automated optical instruments such as nephelometers, as haze is associated with visibility and traffic control in ports. Haze, however, can also be an indication of poor air quality, though this is often better reflected using accurate purpose-built air indexes such as the American Air Quality Index, the Malaysian API (Air Pollution Index), and the Singaporean Pollutant Standards Index.

In hazy conditions, it is likely that the index will report the suspended particulate level. The disclosure of the responsible pollutant is mandated in some jurisdictions.

== Cultural references ==
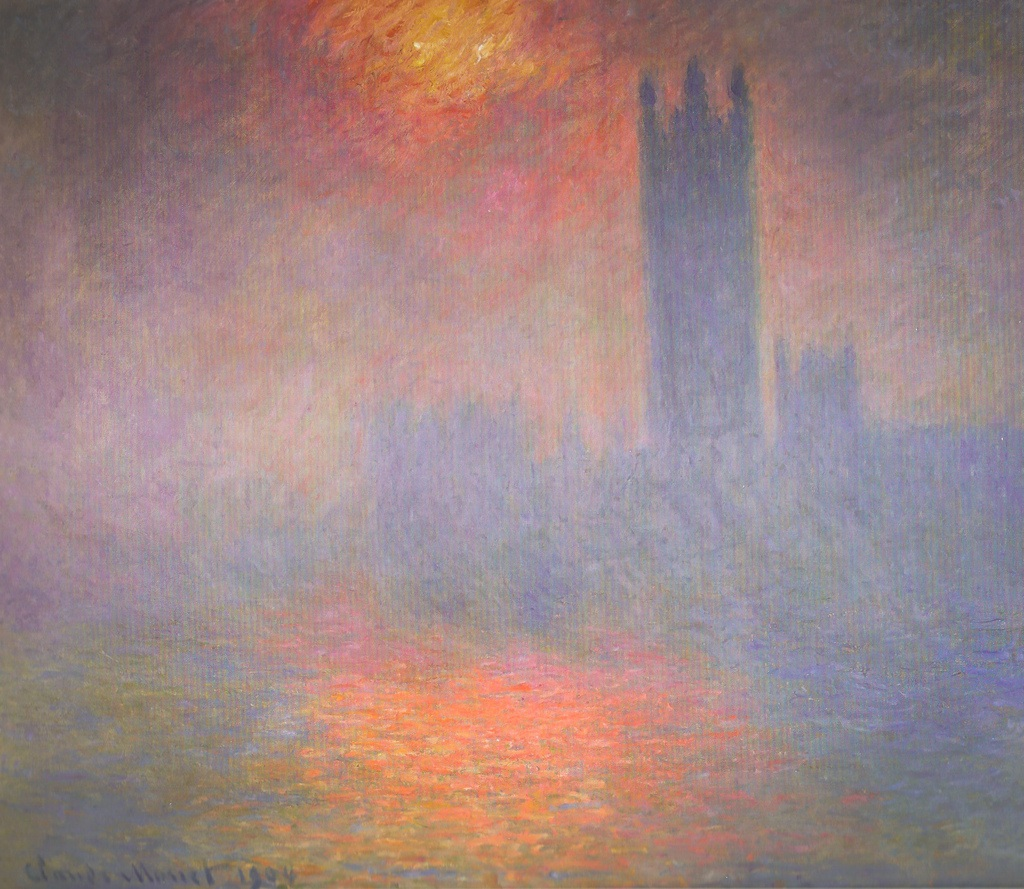
Claude Monet made several trips to London between 1899 and 1901, during which he painted views of the Thames and Houses of Parliament which show the sun struggling to shine through London's smog-laden atmosphere.

- The London "pea-soupers" earned the capital the nickname of "The Smoke". Similarly, Edinburgh was known as "Auld Reekie". The smogs feature in many London novels as a motif indicating hidden danger or a mystery, perhaps most overtly in Margery Allingham's The Tiger in the Smoke (1952), but also in Dickens's Bleak House (1852) and T.S. Eliot's "The Love Song of J. Alfred Prufrock".
- In the 1957 Warner Brothers cartoon, What's Opera, Doc, Elmer Fudd called for various calamities to befall Bugs Bunny, ending in a screamed "SMOG!!"
- The 1970 made-for-TV movie A Clear and Present Danger was one of the first American television network entertainment programs to warn about the problem of smog and air pollution, as it dramatized a man's efforts toward clean air after emphysema killed his friend.
- The history of smog in LA is detailed in Smogtown by Chip Jacobs and William J. Kelly.
- The 2025 documentary series Clearing the Air: The War on Smog follows the history of smog in Los Angeles, from the first sudden appearance of smoky clouds over the city in 1943, to the decades of scientific investigation and public pressure, to the creation of the US EPA and passage of the Clean Air Act, to current day with pollution less than 1% of what it was at its worst.

== See also ==
- Smog tower
- Asian brown cloud
- 1997 Southeast Asian haze
- 2005 Malaysian haze
- 2006 Southeast Asian haze
- 2013 Eastern China smog
- 2013 Northeastern China smog
- 2013 Southeast Asian haze
- 2015 Southeast Asian haze
- Atmospheric chemistry
- CityTrees
- Contrail
- Criteria air contaminants
- Emission standard
- Great Smog of London
- Haze
- Inversion (meteorology)
- List of most polluted cities by particulate matter concentration
- Nitric oxide
- Ozone
- Umweltzone
- Vog
