= Null cycle =

In atmospheric chemistry, a null cycle is a catalytic cycle that simply interconverts chemical species without leading to net production or removal of any component. In the stratosphere, null cycles and when the null cycles are broken are very important to the ozone layer.

One of the most important null cycles takes place in the stratosphere, with the photolysis of ozone by ultraviolet photons with wavelengths less than 330 nanometers. This photolysis produces a monatomic oxygen that then reacts with the diatomic oxygen producing ozone. There is no net molecular or atomic change, however. Overall, the reaction converts UV photon energy into heat thereby warming the stratosphere.

O_{3} + hv (λ < 330 nm) → O_{2} + O (^{1}D)

O (^{1}D) + M → O (^{3}P) + M

O (^{3}P) + O_{2} → O_{3}

Net: hv → H

The null cycle can be broken in the presence of certain molecules, leading to a net increase or decrease in ozone in the stratosphere. One important example is NO_{x} emissions into the stratosphere. The NO_{x} reacts with both the atomic oxygen and ozone leading to a net decrease in ozone. This is particularly important at night when NO_{2} cannot photolyze.

NO + O_{3} → NO_{2} + O_{2}

NO_{2} + O(^{1}D) → NO + O_{2}

Net: O_{3} + O(^{1}D) → 2O_{2} (net loss of ozone)

Null cycles can also occur in the troposphere. One example is the null cycle that occurs during the day between NO_{x} and ozone.

Tropospheric Null Cycle

O_{3} + NO → O_{2} + NO_{2}

NO_{2} + hν → NO + O(^{3}P)

O (^{3}P) + O_{2} + M → O_{3} + M

Net: hv → H

This cycle links ozone to NO_{x} in the troposphere during daytime. In equilibrium, described by the Leighton relationship, solar radiation and the NO_{2}:NO ratio determine ozone abundance, maximizing around noon time.
