= Joseph Joshua Weiss =

Austrian chemist (1905–1972)

Joseph Joshua Weiss (30 August 1905 – 9 April 1972) was a Jewish-Austrian chemist and Professor at Newcastle University. He was a pioneer in the field of radiation chemistry and photochemistry.

== Education and career ==
Weiss was born in 1905 in Austria. He had obtained a Dipl.Ing. degree in the Technische Hochschule in Vienna. He entered the Textile Institute at Sorau in 1928 and was the head of the chemistry department there. He left his post two years later to become an assistant to the German chemist Fritz Haber at the Kaiser Wilhelm Institute for Physical Chemistry and Elektrochemistry in Berlin. Together they discovered the Haber–Weiss reaction. He fled with Haber (who was born Jewish) from Nazi Germany to Cambridge in 1933. He later moved to University College London, where he got his PhD in 1935 from Prof Frederick George Donnan. in 1937 he started teaching at the King's College in Durham, which later became Newcastle University. In the thirties, Weiss published several of his ideas on electron transfer processes in the mechanisms of thermal and photochemical reactions in solution.

In 1956, he was appointed a professor of Radiation Chemistry at Newcastle University.

== Honors and awards ==
In 1968, he received an honorary degree from Technische Universität Berlin. In 1970 he received the Marie Curie Medal from the Curie Institute, and officially retired from his chair at Newcastle. In 1972 the Association for Radiation Research established the Weiss Medal, named after him.

== Personal life ==
In 1942, Weiss married Frances Sonia Lawson, whom he would go on to have two sons and a daughter with.

== See also ==
- Haber–Weiss reaction
