= Ozone monitor =

An ozone monitor is electronic equipment that monitors for ozone concentrations in the air. The instrument may be used to monitor ozone values for industrial applications or to determine the amount of ambient ozone at ground level and determine whether these values violate National Ambient Air Quality Standards (NAAQS). Different types of ozone monitoring methods have been used throughout the decades, the two most notable and common methods being the Federal Reference Method and the Federal Equivalent Method.

== Federal Reference Method ==
The Federal Reference Method (FRM) was the original method of measuring ozone concentration in the air, being used throughout the United States around the 1970s and 1980s. It uses what is known as gas-phase ethylene-chemiluminescence or ET-CL. The ozone content is measured based on the reaction when the air around the monitor reacts with the ethylene reactant gas within the monitor. As of 2015, the EPA added an additional format to the FRM using nitric oxide chemiluminescence or NO-CL. It functions in a very similar manner to that of the ET-CL format except it uses nitric oxide instead of ethylene gas. The FRM has, for the most part, been phased due water vapor causing skewed results and has been replaced with the Federal Equivalent Method which uses ultraviolet absorption. However, the FRM it still used occasionally as the Federal Equivalent Method can be skewed by concentration of other pollutants in higher quantities such as mercury, sulfur dioxide, carbon dioxide, VOCs, and others.

== Federal Equivalent Method ==
The Federal Equivalent Method (FEM) relies on the use of ultraviolet Absorption, more accurately, the ozone molecule absorbs ultraviolet radiation. Most ozone monitors utilized in regulatory applications use ultraviolet absorption to accurately quantify ozone levels. An ozone monitor of this type operates by pulling an air sample from the atmosphere into the machine with an air pump. During one cycle, the ozone monitor will take one air sample through the air inlet, and scrub the ozone from the air; for the next cycle, an air sample bypasses the scrubber and the ozone value calculated. The solenoid valve is electronically activated to shift the air flow either through the scrubber or to bypass it on a timed sequence. The difference between the two sampled values determines the actual ozone value at that time. The monitor may also have options to account for air pressure and air temperature to calculate the value of ozone.

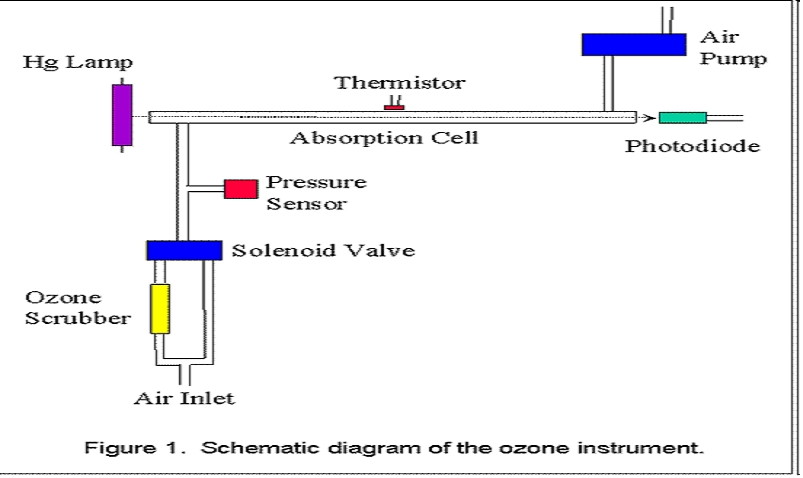

== Measurement ==
The concentration of ozone is determined using the Beer-Lambert Law that basically says that the absorption of light is proportional to the concentration. For ozone, a 254 nanometer wavelength of light created by a mercury lamp is shined through a specific length of tubing with reflective mirrors. A photodiode at the other end of the tube detects the changes of brightness from the light.

The onboard electronics process the values obtained and display the value on the screen and can also output an electrical signal in volts or a 4-20 mA current that can be read by an electronic data logger. Other options for output are RS232 serial port or ethernet or internal data storage on flash memory.

== See also ==
- Environmental science
