= Hydroperoxyl =

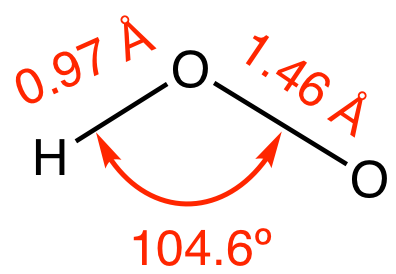

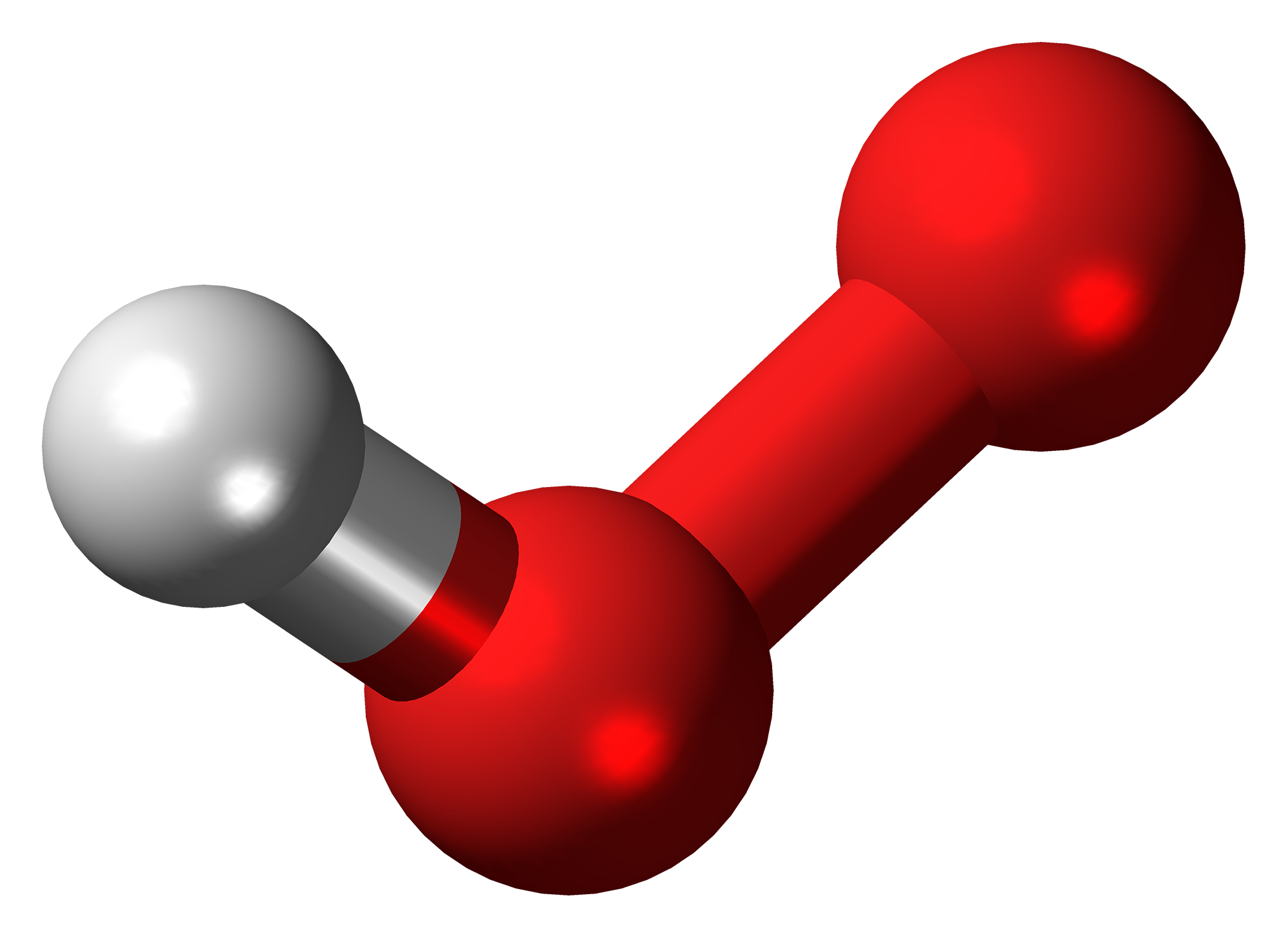

Names
- Preferred IUPAC name Hydroperoxyl
- Systematic IUPAC name Dioxidanyl
- Other names Peroxyl radical, hydrogen superoxide, hydrogen dioxide

Identifiers
CAS Number	3170-83-0
3D model (JSmol)	Interactive image
ChEBI	CHEBI:25935
ChemSpider	454055
Gmelin Reference	506
PubChem CID	520535
CompTox Dashboard (EPA)	DTXSID30894777
- InChI: InChI=1S/HO2/c1-2/h1H Key: OUUQCZGPVNCOIJ-UHFFFAOYSA-N
- SMILES: [O]O

Properties
Chemical formula	HO_{2}
Molar mass	33.006 g·mol^{−1}
Acidity (pK_{a})	4.88
Basicity (pK_{b})	9.12 (basicity of superoxide ion)
Conjugate base	Superoxide anion
- Except where otherwise noted, data are given for materials in their standard state (at 25 °C [77 °F], 100 kPa). Infobox references

The hydroperoxyl radical, also known as the hydrogen superoxide, is the protonated form of superoxide with the chemical formula HO_{2}, also written HOO^{•}. This species plays an important role in the atmosphere and as a reactive oxygen species in cell biology.

== Structure and reactions ==
The molecule has a bent structure.

The superoxide anion, ^{•}O^{−}_{2}, and the hydroperoxyl radical exist in equilibrium in aqueous solution:

^{•}O^{−}_{2} + H_{2}O ⇌ HO^{•}_{2} + HO^{−}

The pK_{a} of HO_{2} is 4.88. Therefore, about 0.3% of any superoxide present in the cytosol of a typical cell is in the protonated form.

It oxidizes nitric oxide to nitrogen dioxide:

^{•}NO + HO^{•}_{2} → ^{•}NO_{2} + HO^{•}

=== Reactive oxygen species in biology ===
Together with its conjugate base superoxide, hydroperoxyl is an important reactive oxygen species. Unlike ^{•}O^{−}_{2}, which has reducing properties, HO^{•}_{2} can act as an oxidant in a number of biologically important reactions, such as the abstraction of hydrogen atoms from tocopherol and polyunsaturated fatty acids in the lipid bilayer. As such, it may be an important initiator of lipid peroxidation.

=== Importance for atmospheric chemistry ===
Because dielectric constant has a strong effect on pK_{a}, and the dielectric constant of air is quite low, superoxide produced photochemically in the atmosphere is almost exclusively present as HO^{•}_{2}. In the troposphere, the hydroperoxyl radical is a major byproduct of the oxidation of carbon monoxide and of hydrocarbons by the hydroxyl radical.

Gaseous hydroperoxyl is involved in reactions that influence both stratospheric and tropospheric ozone. In the stratosphere and in low-NO_{x} regions of the troposphere, the hydroperoxyl radical can react directly with ozone, forming OH^{•} and contributing to ozone depletion:

HO^{•}_{2} + O_{3} → OH^{•} + 2O_{2}

In these low-NO_{x} regions of the troposphere, the hydroperoxyl radical also reacts with itself to form hydrogen peroxide. This process serves as a major source of hydrogen peroxide in the troposphere:

HO^{•}_{2} + HO^{•}_{2} → H_{2}O_{2} + O_{2}

Conversely, in high-NO_{x} regions of the troposphere, the hydroperoxyl radical reacts with NO to produce OH^{•} and NO^{•}_{2}:

HO^{•}_{2} + NO → OH^{•} + NO^{•}_{2}

Subsequent photolysis of the resulting NO^{•}_{2} leads to ozone formation.
