= Air pollution episode =

An air pollution episode is an unusual combination of emissions and meteorology - usually low or stagnant winds and temperature inversion - that creates prolonged and widespread air pollution lasting two to seven days. Effects range from eye irritation to deaths across age groups. Examples of air pollution episodes include:

- 1930 Meuse Valley Episode
- 1939 Saint Louis Episode
- 1948 Donora Episode
- 1952 London Episode
- 1997 Indonesian forest fires Episode
- 2005 Malaysian Haze Episode
- 2006 Southeast Asian Haze Episode
- 1984 Bhopal Gas Tragedy Episode
- 2016 Delhi Episode

== See also ==
Smog, Haze, Ozone, Particulate matter, Air Pollution, Inversion
