= 2013 Northeastern China smog =

Smog wave in China

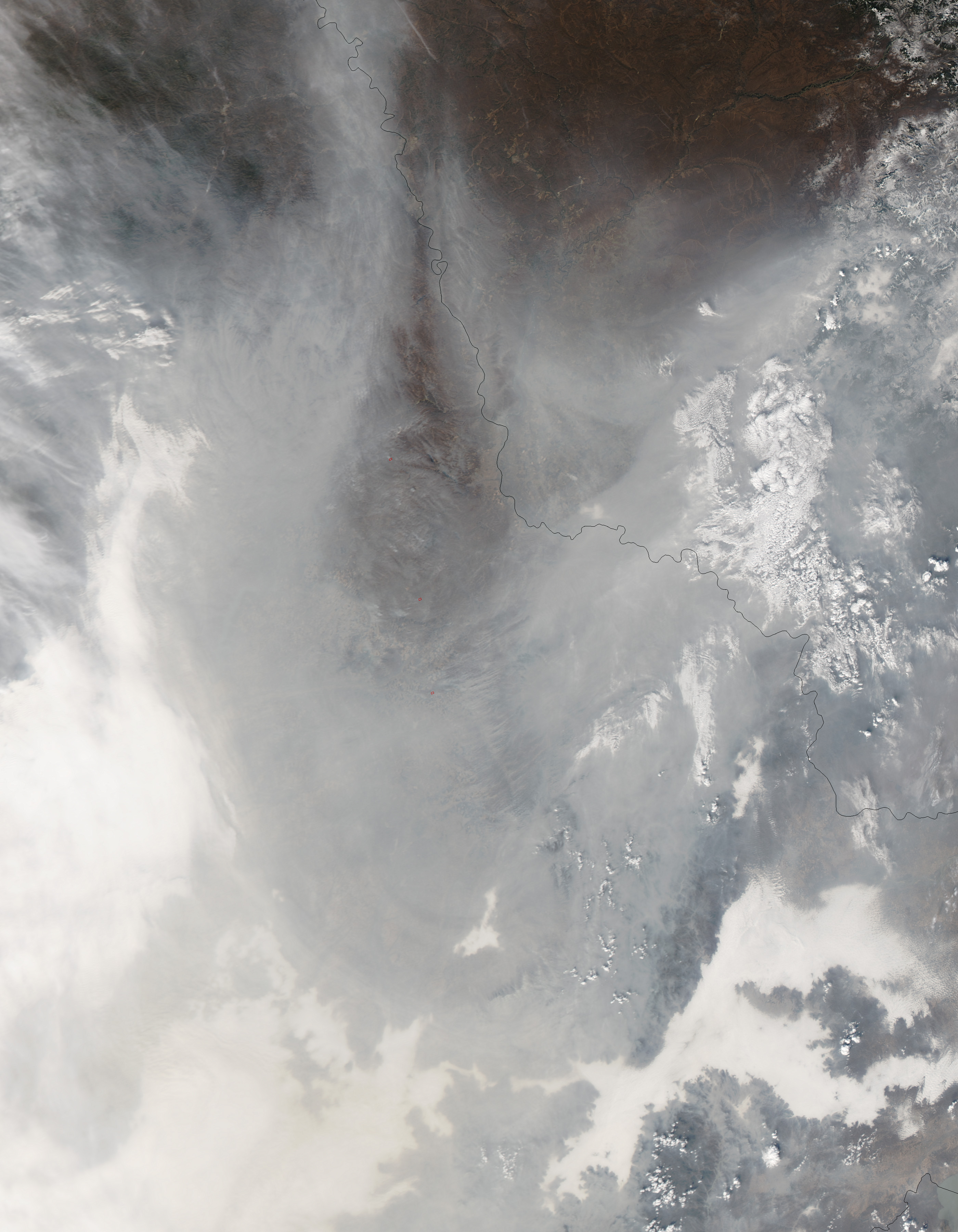
- Smog (grey) and fog (white) cloak northeast China on 21 October 2013.
- Date: 21–25 October 2013
- Location: Heilongjiang, Jilin, and Liaoning Provinces of China

A dense wave of smog began in Northeast China, especially in major cities including Harbin, Changchun and Shenyang, as well as the surrounding Heilongjiang, Jilin, and Liaoning provinces on 20 October 2013. Unseasonably warm temperatures with very little wind across northeastern China coincided with the initiation of Northeast China's coal-powered municipal heating system. Record densities of fine particulates were measured in the city.

In Harbin, the levels of PM_{2.5} particulate matter rose to 1,000 micrograms per cubic metre, worse than Beijing's historic highs. Visibility dropped to 50 metres (160 ft) and authorities grounded flights and closed more than 2,000 schools.

In Changchun, air pollution recorded at an all-time high and the levels of PM_{2.5} particulate matter rose to 845 micrograms per cubic metre on 22 October 2013.

The smog eased on 25 October 2013 and had completely dissipated by the 28th due to a cold front that had moved in from Russia.

== Background ==
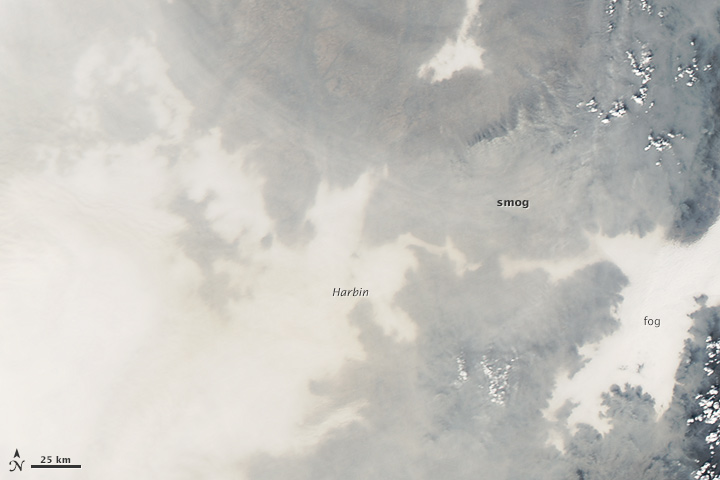
Detail showing position of Harbin in the haze (NASA)

Officials blamed the dense pollution on lack of wind, burning of crop waste in farmers' fields, and 20 October start-up of Harbin's coal-powered district heating system. Harbin lies in the north of China where winter temperatures can drop to −40 °C (−40 °F), necessitating a six-month heating season.

Air pollution in Chinese cities is of increasing concern to China's leadership. Particulates in the air can adversely affect human health and also have impacts on climate and precipitation. Pollution from the burning of coal has reduced life expectancies by 5.5 years in the north of China, as a result of heart and lung diseases. According to the National Environmental Analysis released by Tsinghua University and The Asian Development Bank in January 2013, 7 of 10 most air polluted cities in the world are located in China, including Taiyuan, Beijing, Urumqi, Lanzhou, Chongqing, Jinan and Shijiazhuang. As air pollution in China is at an all-time high, several northern cities are among the most polluted cities and have the worst air quality in China. Reporting on China's airpocalypse has been accompanied by what seems like a monochromatic slideshow of the country's several cities smothered in thick smog. According to a survey made by "Global voices China" in February 2013, China's 10 most polluted cities on the blacklist includes major Chinese cities like Beijing, Jinan, Shijiazhuang, Zhengzhou, and 6 other prefectural cities all in Hebei Province. These cities are all situated in traditional geographic subdivision of North China.

== Effects ==
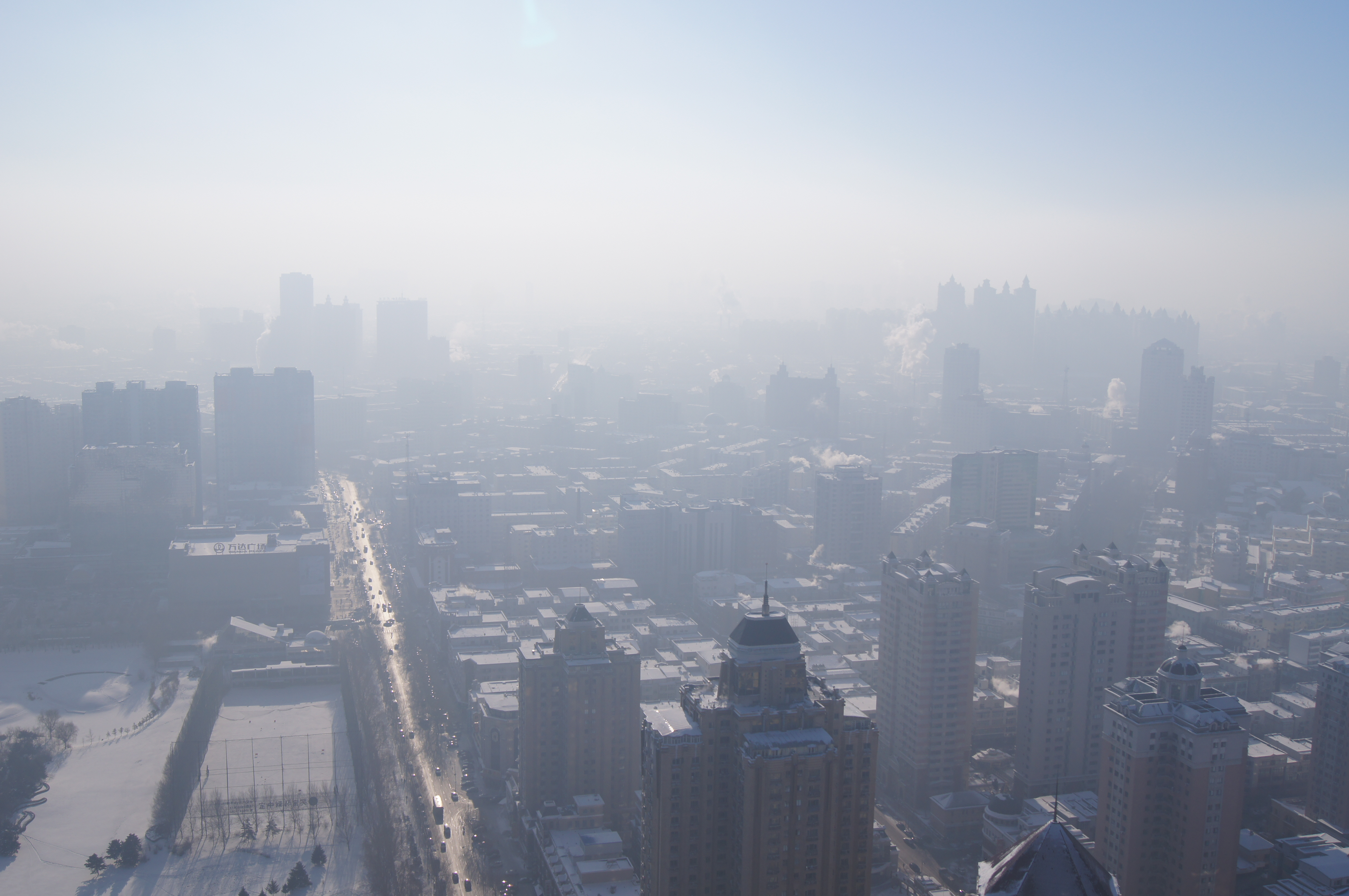
Smog in Harbin, China in December 2012

All highways in the surrounding Heilongjiang province were closed. In Harbin, all primary and middle schools and the airport were closed for three days.

Hospitals reported a 23 percent increase in admissions for respiratory problems.

Visibility was reduced to below 50 m (160 ft) in parts of Harbin, and below 500 m (1,600 ft) in most of the neighboring Jilin province. On Fa Yuen Street in Harbin, visibility of less than 5 m (16 ft) was reported.

In Changchun, the capital of Jilin province, PM2.5 level rose to 845 on 22:00 p.m., 22 October 2013. Visibility of less than 50 m (160 ft) was also reported, but Changchun education bureau refused to close the school and was criticized by parents of the students and public. Other cities in the surrounding Jilin province, including Jilin, Songyuan and Fuyu, ordered the closing of the schools on 22 October.

Daily particulate levels of more than 40 times the World Health Organization recommended maximum level were reported in parts of Harbin municipality. The smog remained as of 23 October, when "almost all monitoring stations in Heilongjiang, Jilin, and Liaoning provinces reported readings above 200 [μg/m^{3}] for PM2.5". PM_{2.5} is the amount of particulate matter less than 2.5 micrometres in diameter in the air, with the World Health Organization recommending a maximum 24-hour mean of 25 micrograms per cubic meter (μg/m^{3}). On the morning of 23 October, PM_{2.5} measurements in Harbin had fallen to an average of 123 μg/m^{3}.

== See also ==
- 1930 Meuse Valley fog
- 1939 St. Louis smog
- 1948 Donora smog
- 2013 Eastern China smog
- 2024 Indo-Pakistani smog
- Great Smog of London
- Pea soup fog
