= 2013 Eastern China smog =

Air pollution event in eastern China

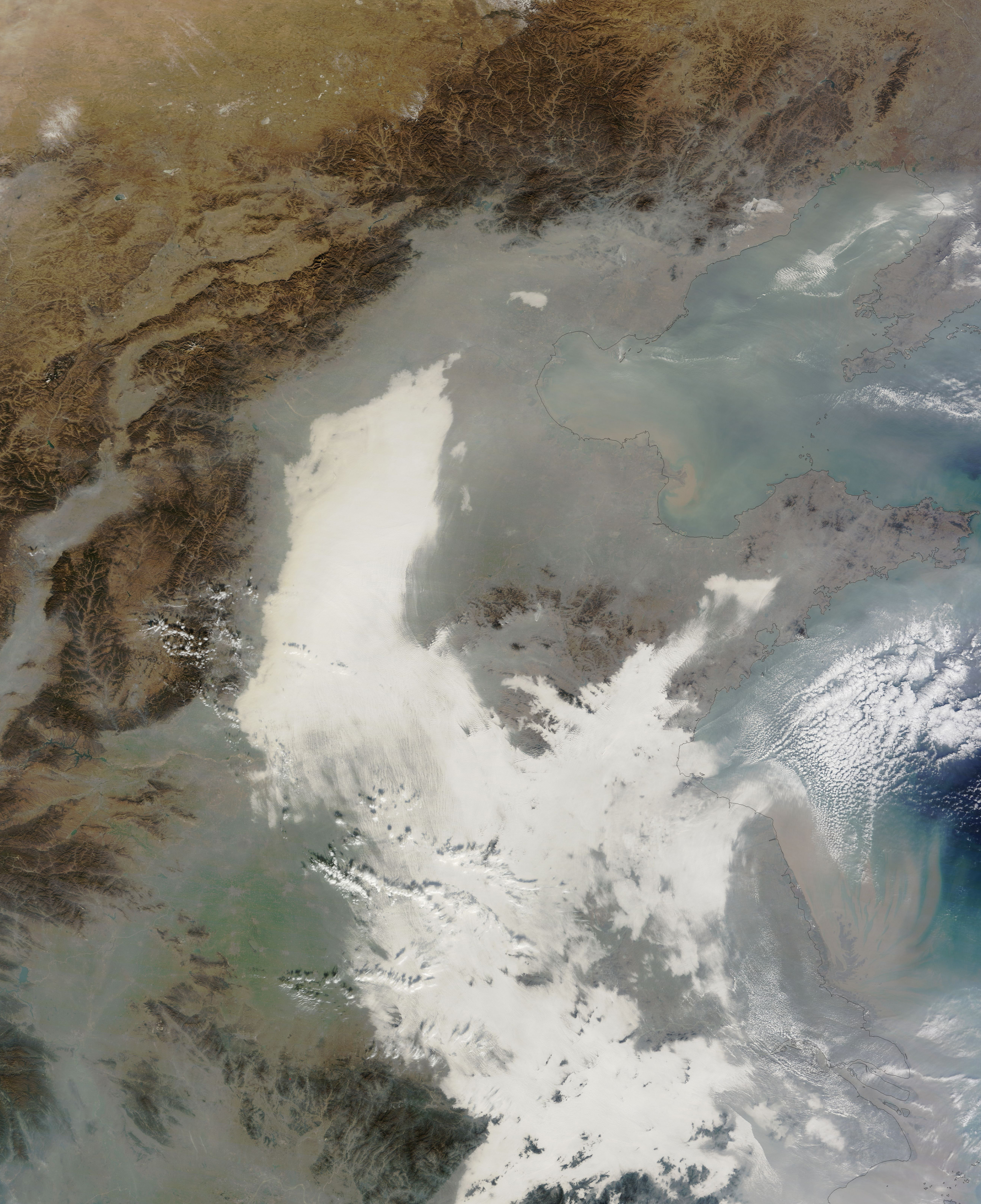
- This 7 December 2013 image from the NASA's Terra satellite shows the severity of smog blanketing Eastern China.
- Date: December 2013
- Location: East China
- Cause: Lack of cold air flow, air masses carrying industrial emissions
- Deaths: 0-10

The 2013 Eastern China smog was a severe air pollution episode that affected East China, including all or parts of the municipalities of Beijing, Shanghai and Tianjin, and the provinces of Hebei, Shandong, Jiangsu, Anhui, Henan, and Zhejiang, during November and December 2013. A lack of cold air flow, combined with slow-moving air masses carrying industrial emissions, collected airborne pollutants to form a thick 350 micrograms per cubic metre; in some areas, they were 500 to 900 micrograms per cubic metre.

It was one of the worst bouts of air pollution in the area, cutting visibility and causing major disruption in transportation and daily activities. Airports, highways, and schools were closed.

== Background ==
In January 2013, China experienced massive fog and haze outbreak affecting about 600 million people and covering seventeen provinces, municipalities and autonomous regions, a fourth of China's territory. On 12 September 2013, the State Council announced the "Air Pollution Prevention Plan". China limited the fine particulate matter level, and the Chinese government officials' assessment index included improving the environment for the first time.

On 4 November 2013, the Chinese Academy of Social Sciences and the China Meteorological Administration jointly released the "Green Paper on Climate Change: Addressing Climate Change (2013)". It stated that the fog and smog in China had increased in the past 50 years with the number of fog-free days significantly reduced, while that of the smog days were significantly increasing with the phenomenon of persisting smog days. The fastest growing fog and smog days occurred in the Pearl and Yangtze River Delta regions, which are the most industrialized areas. The report also indicated that the main reason of increased fog and smog days is the yearly increase in fossil fuel consumption in China. The report calls for urgent implementation of regional joint prevention and control measures to effectively solve the air pollution crisis.

=== Weather ===
Smog started accumulating over the second half of November and first weekend of December 2013. On the last days of November in Beijing the Air Quality Index (AQI) crossed the level of 999. In Shanghai AQI crossed the threshold of 350 on 2 December. The lingering smog also left the air qualities in neighboring cities, such as Nanjing, Jiaxing, at seriously polluted levels. The National Meteorological Center (NMC) issued yellow alert for smog and fog, the third most serious alert in China's four-tiered system. PM_{2.5} particulate levels reached their highest point on 6 December 2013, with Shanghai reaching a high of 507. The U.S. Embassy categorizes air quality readings over 300 as hazardous to all humans, not just those with heart or lung ailments.

According to a NASA Terra Satellite image, the thick haze stretches over Eastern China, across a distance of around 1,200 kilometres (750 mi). The polluted air appears gray on the image and most of the pollution is trapped in the lower boundary layer of a few hundred meters.

=== Causes ===
Coal burning is a primary source of fine particle air pollution. It increased as the weather worsened during winter months and residents burned more coal to keep warm. This increased the amount of sulphate and nitrate (results of coal combusting), which led to higher PM_{2.5}. Research suggests that 41% of the carbon that made up these high PM_{2.5} levels in Shanghai were also from coal burning.

Additionally, there was pollution from industrial sources. Jiangsu, Anhui, Shandong, Henan and many eastern provinces are heavy coal-burning regions. Research shows that prevailing winds blew low-hanging air masses of factory emissions (mostly SO_{2}) towards the east coast of China. Regional transportation also had a significant impact on air quality.

The State Environmental Protection Administration investigates tens of thousands of polluters every year, shutting down thousands of the worst offenders, but has failed to reach its target of reducing emissions by 2 percent. In 2011, a factory manufacturing solar panels in Zhejiang province had been shut down because of toxic emissions of fluorine polluting air and water, sickening nearby residents.

== Effects on major cities and provinces ==
=== Shanghai ===
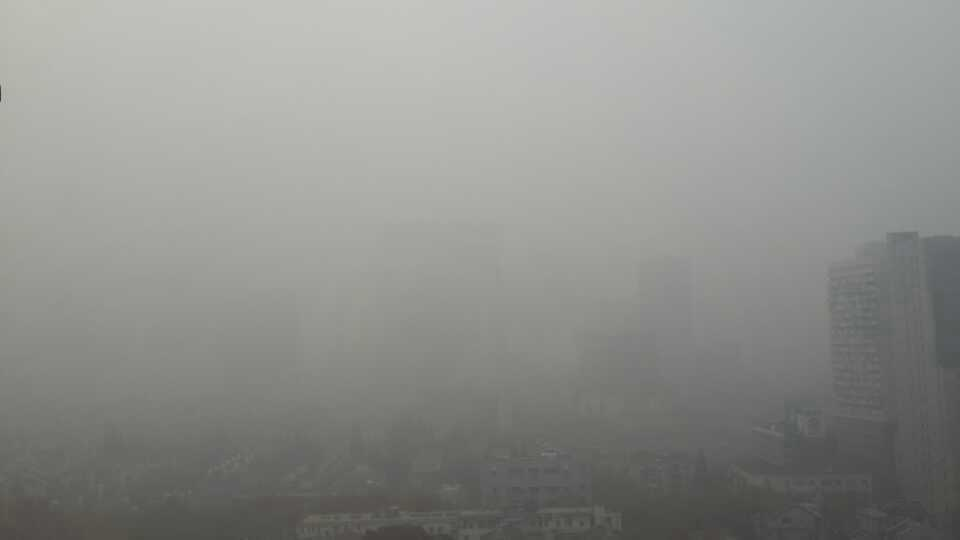
Smog in Huangpu District, Shanghai, 6 December 2013

Air in Shanghai was reported to have a strange taste – astringent and smoky, with an aftertaste of earthy bitterness. It was possible to feel the dust-like particulate matter on tongues.

With such a high concentration of air pollutants, government authorities warned residents of health symptoms, such as coughing and headaches. Citizens were advised to wear protective masks and use air purifiers. Many sanitation workers were required to wear dust masks during work early in the morning. Schools were closed as the government ordered children to stay indoors and reduce outdoor activities as much as possible.

Construction work was halted, and authorities pulled nearly one-third of government vehicles from the roads. A majority of inbound flights were cancelled and more than 50 flights were diverted at Shanghai Pudong International Airport.

=== Nanjing ===
The heavy smog greatly polluted central and southern Jiangsu Province, especially around Nanjing, capital of East China's Jiangsu province. AQI remained at "severely polluted" for five straight days, "heavily polluted" for nine, and hit a record-breaking value of 331. PM_{10} also went over 500 at times. On 3 December 2013, levels of PM_{2.5} particulate matter averaged over 943 micrograms per cubic metre, decreasing to over 338 micrograms per cubic metre on 4 December. Between 3:00 pm, 3 December and 2:00pm, 4 December local time, several expressways from Nanjing to other Jiangsu cities were closed, stranding dozens of passenger buses in Zhongyangmen bus station. From 5 to 6 December, Nanjing's air pollution stayed at red alert, suspending classes in all middle and primary schools and kindergartens. Experts say these figures indicate high levels of dust on construction sites. Children's Hospital outpatient services increased by 33 percent; the general incidence of bronchitis, pneumonia, upper respiratory tract infection increased significantly. The smog dissipated 12 December. Officials blamed the dense pollution on lack of wind, automobile exhaust emissions under low air pressure and coal-powered district heating system in North China.

=== Jiangxi ===
Visibility was reduced to less than 50 meters. Many highways in East China's Jiangxi province were closed.

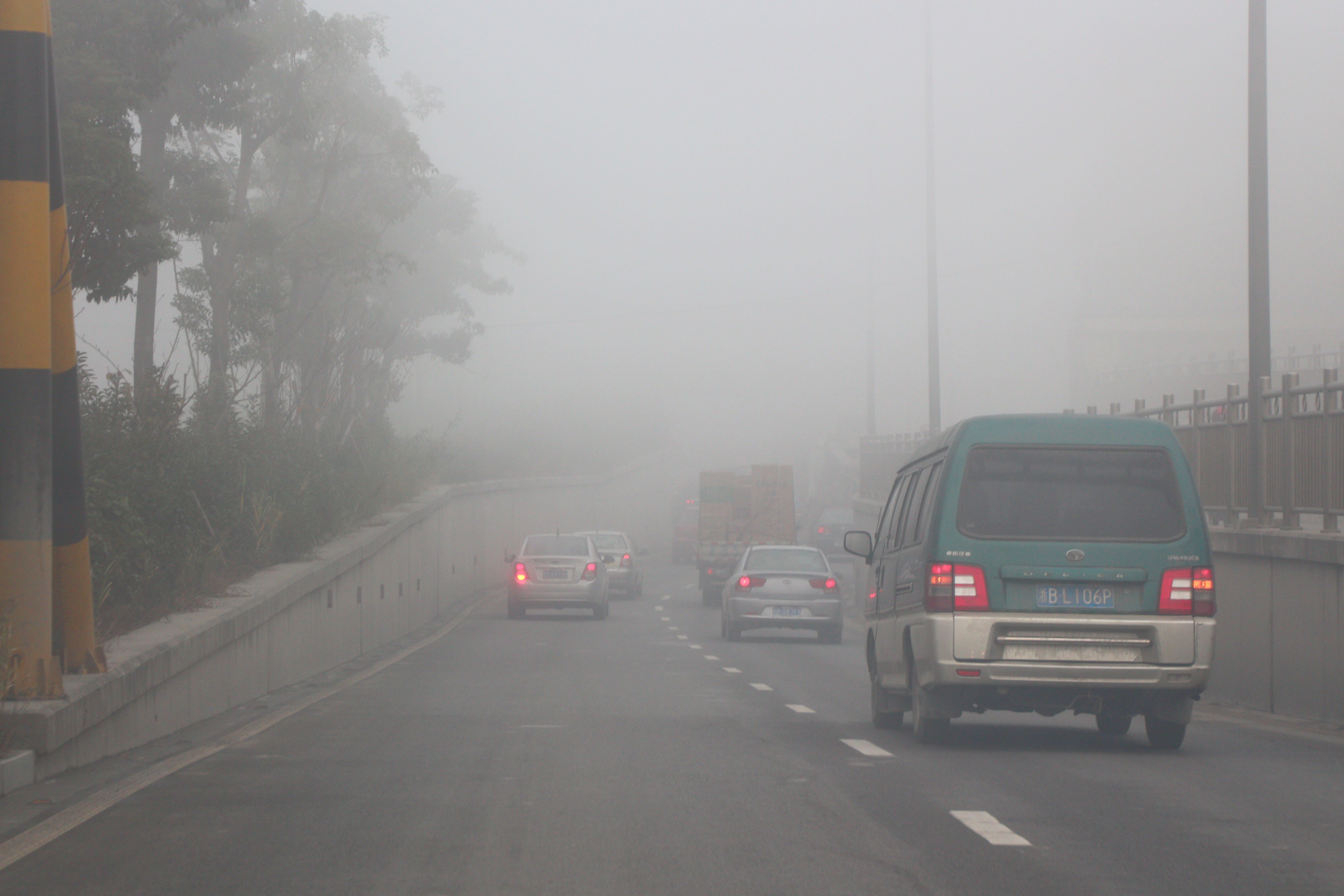
Air contamination in Ningbo, Zhejiang, 7 December 2013

== Environmental impacts ==
The severe smog is raising awareness in re-assessing China's air pollution. On 12 February 2014, China's cabinet announced that government will implement a series of measures aimed at shifting the primary energy source from coal to natural gas and renewables. Pricing mechanisms will be used to favor cleaner alternatives to coal. Financial incentives will be offered to encourage green energy companies. The government will place tougher controls over emissions and better support for developing clean technologies. It will also set up a 10 billion renminbi (US$1.7 billion) fund to help companies to meet new environmental standards.

== Pollutants ==
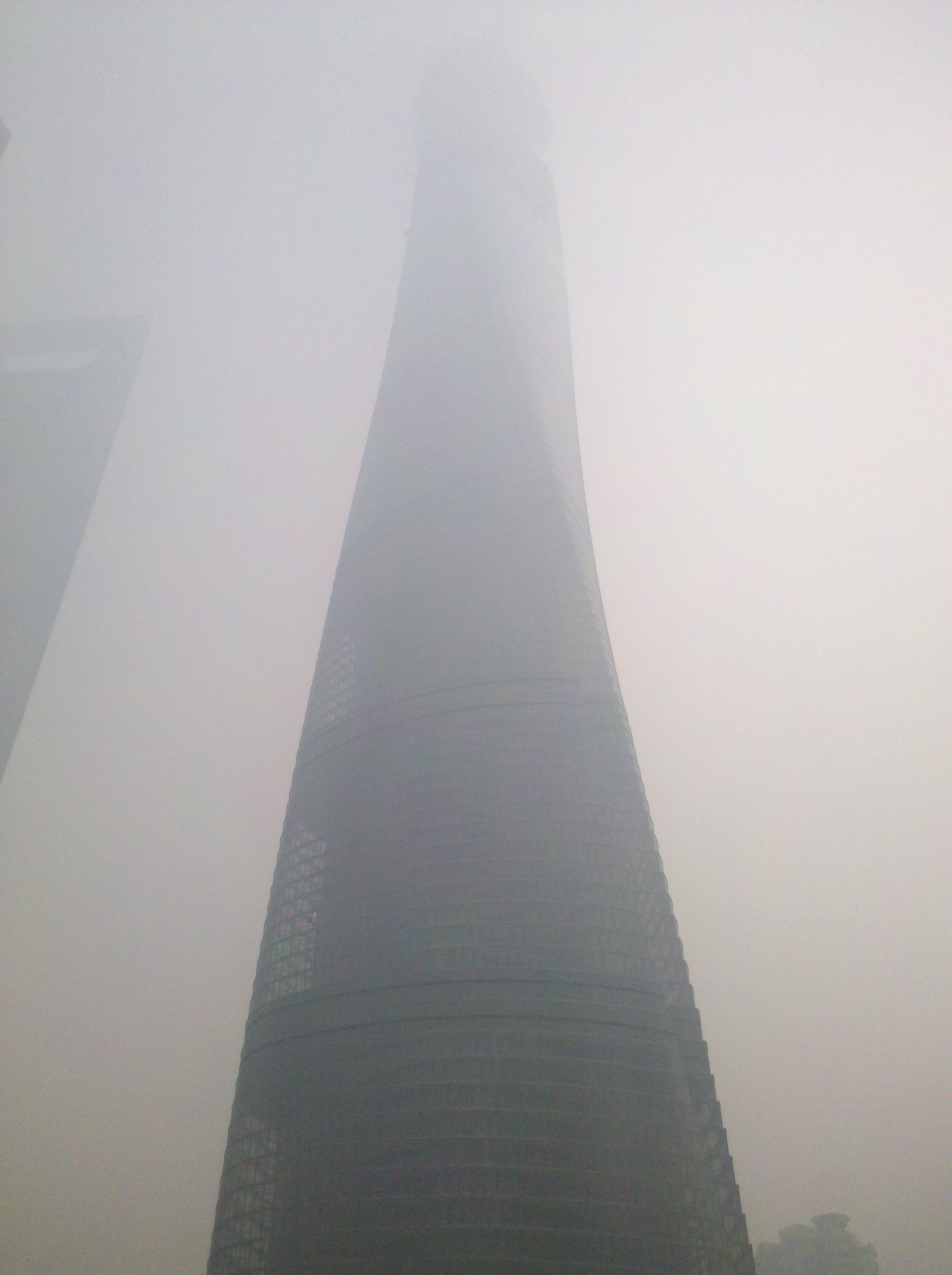
Heavy smog obscures the top of Shanghai Tower

PM_{2.5}, a particulate matter with a diameter of 2.5 micrometers or less, is one of the major components of the air pollution in Eastern China, contributing to the growing smog problem in large areas across cities.

The composition of PM_{2.5} particles varies, and they are often made of heavy metals and various toxic compounds, such as lead and sulfate. Small particles can be suspended in the air for long periods of time due to their low masses. While some particles such as large-size carbon may be seen as soot and smoke, most of them can only be detected with a microscope. The Chinese Academy of Sciences indicated that smog in Beijing is a combination of both artificial factors and natural factors. While various causes such as coal burning and car emissions come from human activity, natural causes such as the humid weather and a lack of wind also contributed to the smog.

A study in 2005 in Beijing showed that PM_{2.5} is mostly composed of carbon, SO^{2−}_{4} salts, NO^{−}_{3} salts, and NH^{+}_{4} salts. PM_{2.5} is a byproduct of the process of coal burning from power stations and produces significant amounts of sulfate, black carbon, ammonium, and nitrate. In 1989, 32.7% of PM_{2.5} particulates in Beijing came from burning of coal, which decreased to 16.4% in 2000, as people started to use cleaner energy such as natural gas. Automobile exhaust also significantly contributed to the smog problem. More importantly, such chemicals, along with organic carbon released from coal burning, may react with each other in the air, creating more toxic, harmful particles made of SO^{2−}_{4} and NO^{−}_{3}.

PM_{2.5} particles are small enough to pass through the human respiratory system and reach the lung, causing problems like heart attacks and asthma attacks. In northern China, people live, on average, 5.5 years fewer than those in southern China, because of the over-reliance on burning coal for heating systems, which produces huge amounts of PM_{2.5} pollutants in winter.

Pollution from China has already affected other countries, and some ozone-forming particles have travelled across the Pacific Ocean to the United States, contributing to a relatively high level of ozone on the American West Coast. While these particles, along with other ozone-related chemicals, can be carried up to 30,000 feet above the ground, researchers in the United States predict that these pollutants may play a bigger role in the near future.

=== Bacteria in PM_{2.5} ===
Scientists are still trying to understand the microorganisms within PM_{2.5} particles and how they are spread through pollutants. Research indicated that many kinds of pathogens and bacteria can be spread through PM_{2.5} smog and cause diseases. For example, Chinese researchers have found that smog in Beijing contains significant amounts of inhalable microbial allergens and pathogenic species, which increase the risk of respiratory diseases. The same study also reported that among all the microorganisms within PM_{2.5} particles, 86.1% are bacteria, 13% eukaryota, 0.8% archaea, and 0.1% viruses. The smog contains a variety of microorganisms such as Actinomycetota, Pseudomonadota, Chloroflexota, Bacillota, Bacteroidota, and "Euryarchaeota". Many of these are not harmful to humans, but some pathogenic microorganisms are carried through smog, and their numbers increase as the pollutant level increases.

More than 1,300 kinds of microorganisms have been detected on PM_{2.5} particles. Because PM_{2.5} particles have relatively large surface area, many microorganisms from the soil easily attach to them, spreading them quickly through wind. For example, scientists detected that Aspergillus fumigatus var. fumigatus, a fungus which triggers allergic reactions in the respiratory system, are 1% to 8% of microorganisms found on PM_{2.5} particles.

=== Index ===
The United States Environmental Protection Agency (EPA) has developed an Air Quality Index that is used to report air quality. This AQI is divided into six categories indicating increasing levels of health concern. A PM_{2.5} concentration lower than 12 μg/m^{3} indicates good air quality and between 12 and 35 μg/m^{3} the airquality is moderate. An AQI value over 300 represents hazardous air quality and below 50 the air quality is good. In December 2013, huge areas of Eastern China reached "hazardous" level for multiple days.

Air Quality Index (AQI) Values	Levels of Health Concern	Concentration (μg/m^{3})
0 to 50	Good	0-12
51 to 100	Moderate	12-35
101 to 150	Unhealthy for sensitive groups	35-55
151 to 200	Unhealthy	56-150
201 to 300	Very unhealthy	151-250
301 to 500	Hazardous	251+

== See also ==
- 1930 Meuse Valley fog
- 1939 St. Louis smog
- 1948 Donora smog
- 2013 Northeastern China smog
- 2024 Indo-Pakistani smog
- Great Smog of London
- Pea soup fog
- Air pollution in China
