= Devra Davis =

American epidemiologist and writer

Devra Lee Davis
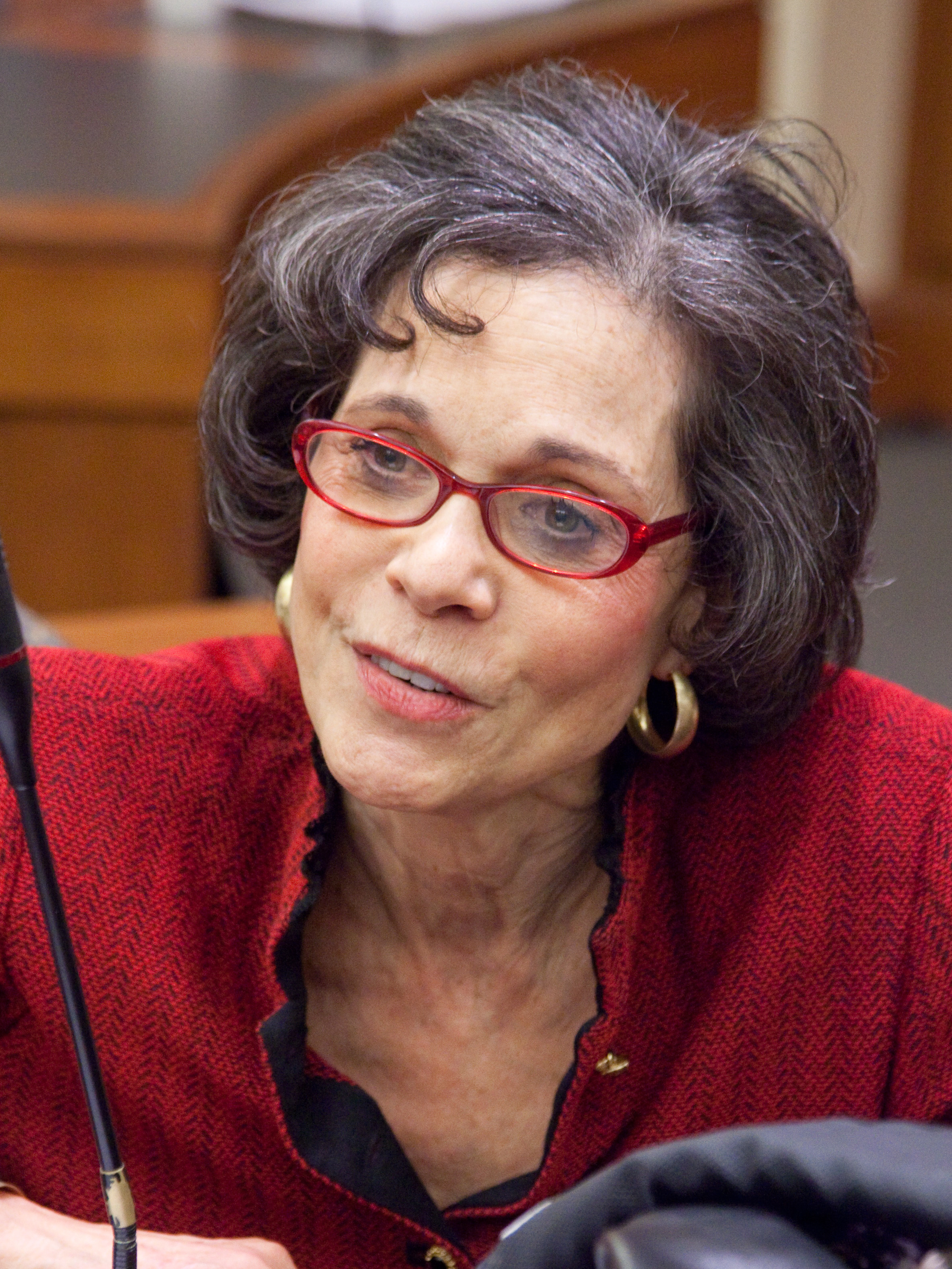
- Davis in 2011
- Born: June 7, 1946 (age 80); Washington, D.C., U.S.
- Education: University of Pittsburgh (BS, MA); University of Chicago (PhD); Johns Hopkins University (MPH)
- Occupations: Epidemiologist; Toxicologist
- Organization: Environmental Health Trust
- Spouse: Richard D. Morgenstern

Devra Lee Davis (born June 7, 1946) is an American epidemiologist, toxicologist, and author of three books about environmental hazards. She was founding director of the Center for Environmental Oncology at the University of Pittsburgh Cancer Institute, and is a former professor of epidemiology at University of Pittsburgh Graduate School of Public Health. She has served on several governmental and non-governmental organizations, conducting research and advocacy into effects of pesticides, asbestos, and wireless radiation on human health, especially cancers.

Davis is the founder and president of the Environmental Health Trust, a non-profit organization which argues that mobile devices, WiFi, 5G, and other radio-frequency systems pose a health risk to humans and the environment. She has been called a "crusader in the fight over cell phone safety" and believes that radio frequencies could cause cancer. Such claims have been challenged by critics as being bereft of credible arguments.

== Early life and education ==
Devra Lee Davis was born June 7, 1946, in Washington, D.C., to Harry and Jean Langer Davis, and raised in the steel making town of Donora, Pennsylvania, where in 1948 a severe smog event killed 20 people and sickened thousands. Davis was the oldest of four children; her father was a chemist and machinist in the local steel mills, as well as a brigadier general in the Pennsylvania National Guard and her mother was a homemaker. Raised in a Jewish family, as a child she briefly considered becoming a rabbi. At age 14, her family moved to Pittsburgh, where she attended Taylor Allderdice High School.

Davis then attended the University of Pittsburgh, where in 1967 she earned a Bachelor of Science degree in physiological psychology and an MA in sociology. She learned of the Donora smog incident as a university student, which inspired her interest in epidemiology. She completed a PhD in science studies at the University of Chicago as a Danforth Foundation graduate fellow in 1972, and in 1982 earned a Master of Public Health degree in epidemiology at Johns Hopkins University as a National Cancer Institute senior post-doctoral fellow.

== Career ==
In the late 1970s, as a policy advisor for the Environmental Law Institute, Davis began publishing articles examining links between environmental chemicals and cancer. Davis was appointed resident scholar at the National Research Council of the National Academy of Sciences in 1989.

In 1990, she led a study published in The Lancet along with National Institute for Environmental Health Sciences director David Hoel, British census director John Fox, and World Health Organization statistician Alan Lopez, examining cancer rates in the United States, Japan, and several European countries, concluding "all forms of cancer are increasing in persons over age 54 except lung and stomach" and "the changes in cancer other than lung are so great and rapid that their causes demand intensive investigation." The paper reignited debate between prominent epidemiologists over how to interpret cancer trends: Bruce Ames, Richard Doll, and Richard Peto, among others argued the trends were unimportant: more attributed to better diagnoses and increasing human longevity, while Davis' views gained support from Philip J. Landrigan and biostatisticians such as John C. Bailar and Thomas C. Chalmers.

Davis was appointed by President Clinton to the US Chemical Safety and Hazard Investigation Board. In 1997 she was working as a consultant to the World Health Organization and served as a member of the Board of Scientific Counselors of the US National Toxicology Program.

Davis founded the International Breast Cancer Prevention Collaborative Research Group, an organization dedicated to exploring the causes of breast cancer. As senior adviser to the US Assistant Secretary for Health, Davis claimed that extra doses of estrogen-like compounds in the environment may increase the quantities of hormone some women receive to dangerous levels and can cause serious illness.

Davis served five years as the founding director of the Center for Environmental Oncology at the University of Pittsburgh Cancer Institute (UPCI). In 2009, she stepped down to become professor in the Department of Epidemiology at the University of Pittsburgh Graduate School of Public Health. She has authored over 200 scientific papers as well as three books.

=== When Smoke Ran Like Water ===
Davis' 2002 book, When Smoke Ran Like Water: Tales of Environmental Deception and the Battle Against Pollution, describes how environmental toxins are linked to cancers and other health problems. She provides accounts of the 1948 Donora smog in her hometown, the 1952 Great Smog of London, and other events. She also criticizes industry interests who dismiss evidence they dislike as "junk science." The book was a finalist for that year's National Book Award for Nonfiction.

Public health philosopher Kristin Shrader-Frechette praised it as "the best book on public health and environmental pollution of the last 30 years." Science writer Fred Pearce in New Scientist called Davis a "a hero with a nose for trouble" and drew comparisons to Rachel Carson, the author of Silent Spring. Other writers have compared and Davis and Carson, both in their styles and themes of writing and their small town Pennsylvania upbringings. Epidemiologist Bert Brunekreef wrote the book is "at its best when describing how commercial interests have harassed well known environmental health scientists in attempts to downplay the seriousness of, say, the effects of environmental lead on the IQ of children," but found "an alarming number of errors" regarding air pollution.

=== The Secret History of the War on Cancer ===
Davis' second book, The Secret History of the War on Cancer, was published in 2007. In it, she argues that medical institutions involved in the "war on cancer" have focused more on cures than on prevention, and that some safety research into environmental toxicity suffers from a conflict of interest due to funding from companies who make products suspected of causing harm.

James Huff, associate director for chemical carcinogenesis of the National Institute of Environmental Health Sciences, called it "exhaustively researched and deftly written, illuminat[ing] more of the truth about chemicals and cancer and the relatively simple means of preventing or reducing cancer burdens." Epidemiologist Richard Clapp called the book "a welcome addition to the struggle to correct the imbalance" between curative and preventative research, while science writer Fred Pearce wrote it "is a rattling good read and raises vital issues that remain relevant today." In a positive review, science journalist Dan Fagin called Davis "her generation's strongest advocate of the idea that synthetic chemicals are a seriously under-recognized cause of cancer."

Medical historian Peter Keating, however, found the book "largely unoriginal" and poorly organized. Epidemiologist Peter Boyle wrote that "devotees of conspiracy theories and aficionados of gossip and innuendo will be drawn towards this book like wasps to a juicy piece of meat" and discussed how the book suggested that the link between tobacco and cancer was used to distract from other possible sources.

=== Wireless radiation ===
In 2007 Davis founded the Environmental Health Trust (EHT), a nonprofit with the goal of promoting awareness of environmental issues it believes are linked to cancer. The EHT campaigns for safer cell phone use, and has challenged research that finds no links between cellular phones and cancer, advocated for more research into the effects of wireless radiation on children, and called on the US federal government to reassess its safety guidelines for wireless technology.

Davis has been called a "crusader in the fight over cell phone safety". She claims that radiation from mobile phones and WiFi pose health risks including increases in cancer, but her claims are disputed by other cancer researchers and organizations including the US National Cancer Institute and Cancer Council Australia. She claims much research that finds no effects is industry-funded and biased. She summarized her research into health effects of cell phones in her 2010 book, Disconnect: The Truth about Cell Phone Radiation, What the Industry Has Done to Hide It, and How to Protect Your Family. She has cited the World Health Organization's 2011 classification of wireless radiation as a Class 2B agent ("Possibly Carcinogenic to Humans"). Critics of Davis have accused her of "cherry-picking" evidence and misrepresenting the studies upon which her conclusions were drawn, while the EHT has been accused of promoting low quality sources.

Davis was featured prominently in a controversial 2016 episode of the Australian TV program Catalyst, in which she claimed "every single well-designed study ever conducted finds an increased risk of brain cancer with the heaviest users [of mobile phones]". The episode drew heavy criticism from researchers, and Davis' claims were refuted by public health scholar Simon Chapman, who claims there is no evidence of increase brain cancer rates in Australians, as well as Rodney Croft, a commissioner with the International Commission on Non-Ionizing Radiation Protection, who called the views of Davis "a fringe position that is not supported by science."

Davis claims that radiation from 5G wireless technology poses health risks, and BBC Radio 4 has called Davis one of the most influential scientists in 5G-opposition movements. An excerpt of a lecture by Davis was used by new-age conspiracy promoter Sacha Stone in his 2020 film 5G Apocalypse: Extinction Event.

In 2021, the EHT and other groups filed a lawsuit asserting the Federal Communications Commission (FCC) failed to consider new scientific evidence when deciding in 2019 not to update its safety guidelines for cellular phone and cellular tower radiation, which had not been updated since 1996. The U.S. Court of Appeals for the District of Columbia ruled in favor of the EHT and plaintiffs, finding the FCC "failed to provide a reasoned explanation for its determination that its guidelines adequately protect against the harmful effects of exposure to radiofrequency radiation unrelated to cancer."

== Personal life ==
In 1975 Davis married Richard D. Morgenstern, an economist with Resources for the Future, and a former Environmental Protection Agency official. They have two children.

Both of Davis's parents died from cancer: her father from multiple myeloma in 1984, and her mother from stomach cancer in 2003. Davis told The New York Times Magazine that, although she decided to devote herself to cancer research shortly after her father's death, his illness was not the reason for that decision.

== Books ==
- Ng, Lorenz K. Y.; Davis, Devra Lee, eds. (1981). Strategies For Public Health: Promoting Health and Preventing Disease. New York: Van Nostrand Reinhold. ISBN 0442244282.
- Davis, Devra Lee; Hoel, David, eds. (1990). Trends in Cancer Mortality in Industrial Countries. New York: New York Academy of Sciences. ISBN 978-0897666435.
- Davis, Devra Lee (2002). When Smoke Ran Like Water: Tales of Environmental Deception and the Battle Against Pollution. New York: Basic Books. ISBN 9781903985502.
- Davis, Devra Lee (2007). The Secret History of the War on Cancer. New York: Basic Books. ISBN 9780465015665.
- Davis, Devra Lee (2010). Disconnect: The Truth about Cell Phone Radiation, What the Industry Has Done to Hide It, and How to Protect Your Family. New York: Dutton. ISBN 9780525951940.
