= 2024 India–Pakistan smog =

Record-breaking air pollution event in South Asia

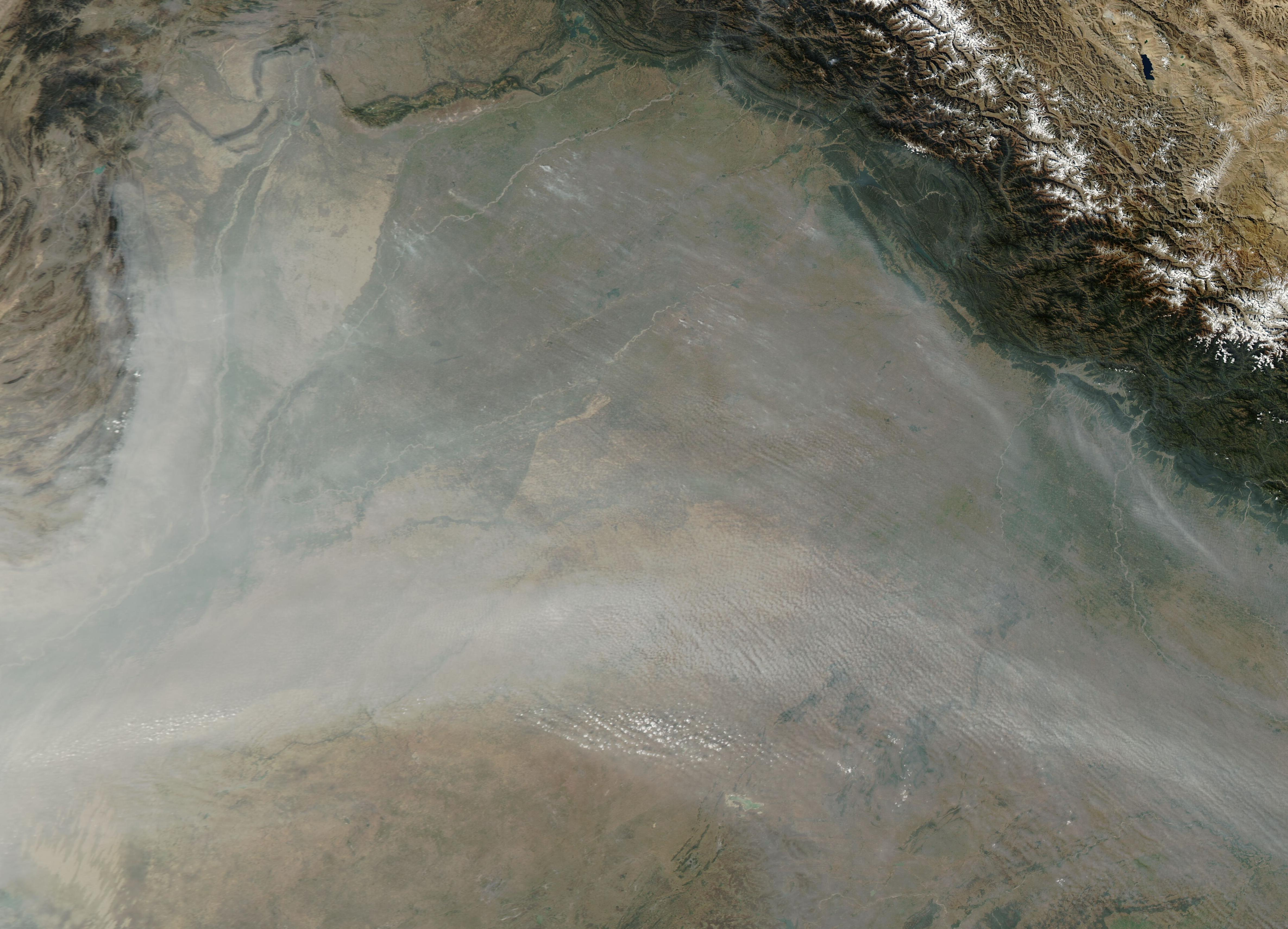
- NASA satellite imaging of air pollution over North India on 31 October 2024
- Date: 28 October 2024 – ongoing
- Location: Eastern and Northern Pakistan, Northern India
- Type: Seasonal air pollution
- Cause: Agricultural burning, vehicular traffic, coal burning, urbanization, seasonal weather patterns, Diwali firework celebrations
- Deaths: 3+
- Injuries: ~1.8 million in Punjab, Pakistan
- Air quality index of 2,553 and PM2.5 concentration of 947 μg per cubic metre reached in Multan on 8 November.

The 2024 India–Pakistan smog was a severe air pollution event that affected Eastern and Northern Pakistan and North India in November 2024, primarily in the Pakistani city of Lahore and Indian city of Delhi. The smog overwhelmed the Pakistani healthcare system due to respiratory disease and throat and eye irritations, leading to widespread school closures and restrictions on public activities particularly in Pakistan's Punjab region.

== Background ==
In Pakistan, severe and hazardous air pollution emerges annually during winter months. Contributing factors include agricultural waste burning, emissions from coal-powered facilities, vehicular traffic, and seasonal weather patterns. In the Punjab region, winter's colder, drier air masses trap pollutants close to the ground, unlike warmer air which typically disperses contamination upward. Rapid urbanization with insufficient environmental regulation has intensified air pollution during winter months.

== Smog ==
The air pollution generated in November 2024 in India and Pakistan was regarded by climate researchers as an unprecedented intensification of the region's annual pollution cycle. NASA satellite imaging showed a continuous cloud of smog that extended across the majority of eastern and northern Pakistan, as well as northwestern India.

=== Pakistan ===
In Lahore, Pakistan's second-largest city, air quality index (AQI) readings exceeded 1,200—four times the threshold considered hazardous to human health (300). It had the highest AQI reading globally on 7 November. Throughout Punjab province, with its population of 127 million, air quality indices frequently surpassed 1,000. In Multan, levels of PM2.5, regarded by health experts as the most dangerous microscopic pollutant, reached concentrations of 947 μg per cubic metre on 8 November, nearly 190 times the World Health Organization's safety guidelines. On the same day, Multan documented unprecedented AQI readings that reached 2,553.

=== India ===
Pollution in Delhi reached drastic levels following Diwali celebrations, when illegal firecracker use temporarily pushed the city's pollution levels above Lahore's on the morning of 8 November. A local community health clinic reported that approximately 60% of patients presented with pollution-related illnesses, with children and elderly individuals particularly affected. Delhi again became one of the most polluted cities in the world on 18 November, reaching an AQI reading of 1,500.

== Impact ==
The smog created severe health consequences across the region. The pollution surge overwhelmed Pakistan's healthcare system, with more than 30,000 patients seeking treatment for respiratory ailments in affected districts. The Pakistan Environmental Protection Agency reported unprecedented increases in cases of lung diseases, allergies, and eye and throat irritations in multiple districts including Faisalabad, Multan, and Gujranwala. By 12 November, 1.8 million people in Punjab province were estimated to have suffered respiratory or eye irritation-related health consequences due to the smog.

Children were especially vulnerable to health compilations during the crisis. UNICEF reported that over 11 million children under age five were exposed to hazardous air conditions in the worst-affected areas. Health experts emphasized children's heightened susceptibility due to their developing organs and immune systems, which could result in long-term detrimental health impacts. Save the Children Pakistan noted that beyond immediate health risks, the crisis disrupted education and increased children's vulnerability to infectious diseases.

The smog disproportionately impacted households with lower socioeconomic standings due to the prohibitive cost of air purifiers necessary to mitigate indoor air pollution. Historian Ammar Ali Jan referred to the impact of the smog as "a form of environmental apartheid". Several Lahore residents described the city as having become "unlivable" due to the intense smog. Three deaths from vehicle accidents were attributed to the smog in Faisalabad.

== Response ==
In November 2024, the government of Pakistan implemented several restrictions in order to limit the impact of the smog on civilian health. Schools and government offices were shut down until 17 November, while parks, zoos, museums, and historical sites in 18 impacted districts were closed for 10 days. In addition, the government implemented restrictions on outdoor activities including sports events and outdoor dining in four districts, which included Lahore, while early closure requirements were implemented for markets and shops, excepting services deemed essential such as gas stations, pharmacies, and certain food and medical stores. Certain high-smog devices were temporarily banned, including unfiltered barbecues at restaurants and auto rickshaws.

The smog prompted Punjab officials to attempt to initiate dialogue with the Indian government regarding collaborative solutions in a letter. Chief Minister of Punjab Maryam Nawaz proposed "smog diplomacy" between India and Pakistan, stating that "air doesn't recognize borders."

== See also ==
- Air pollution in Delhi
- Air pollution in Lahore
- Air pollution in India
- Firecrackers in India

=== Other significant smog events ===
- 1930 Meuse Valley fog
- 1939 St. Louis smog
- 1948 Donora smog
- 2013 Northeastern China smog
- Great Smog of London
