= Richard Clapp =

Richard Clapp may refer to:

- Richard Clapp (epidemiologist)
- Stubby Clapp (Richard Keith Clapp; born 1973), Canadian baseball player and coach
