= Stan Musial Bridge =

Stan Musial Bridge may refer to:

- Donora Monessen Bridge in Pennsylvania
- Stan Musial Veterans Memorial Bridge in St. Louis, Missouri - East St. Louis, Illinois
