= Donora–Webster Bridge =

- Coordinates: 40°11′02″N 79°51′07″W
- Carries: 2 lanes of 10th Street
- Crosses: Monongahela River
- Locale: Donora, Pennsylvania, Washington County, Pennsylvania, and Rostraver Township, Pennsylvania

Characteristics
- Design: Truss bridge
- Total length: 1,531 feet (467 m)
- Longest span: 515 feet (157 m)
- Clearance below: 67 feet (20 m)

History
- Opened: 1908
- Closed: 2009 (demolished 2015)
- Webster Donora Bridge
- U.S. National Register of Historic Places
- Washington County History & Landmarks Foundation Landmark
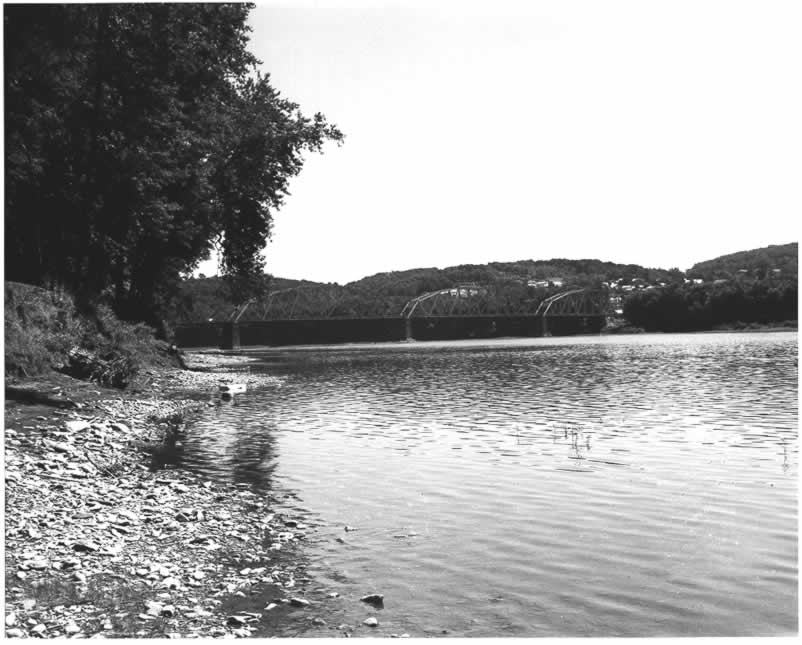
- Webster Donora Bridge in 1982

- Location within Pennsylvania Location within the United States
- Location: A 143 over Monongahela River, Donora, Pennsylvania
- Coordinates: 40°11′3″N 79°51′8″W
- Area: 1.5 acres (0.61 ha)
- Built: 1906
- Architect: Wylie, William; Sofias Construction Company
- Architectural style: Multiple-span through truss
- MPS: Highway Bridges Owned by the Commonwealth of Pennsylvania, Department of Transportation TR
- NRHP reference No.: 88000813
- Added to NRHP: June 22, 1988

Location
- Interactive map of Donora–Webster Bridge

The Donora–Webster Bridge was a truss bridge spanning the Monongahela River between the borough of Donora, Pennsylvania and the village of Webster in Rostraver Township, Pennsylvania. Originally built in 1908 to serve rail traffic, the bridge was eventually fully converted in 1938 for automobile use only.. The structure connected Route 837 on the west bank of the river and Route 906 on the east side. The closest open crossings are at Route 1022 (Donora-Monessen Bridge) to the south (upstream), and the Route 136 (Monongahela City Bridge) to the north (downstream), a several-mile detour either way. As early as the 1960s, the bridge had been known to be functionally obsolete, resulting in construction of the Donora–Monessen Bridge. and on July 1, 2015, the bridge was demolished after being closed for several years due to severe structural deficiency.

The bridge's closure was the subject of criticism by locals, as it was blamed for worsening Donora's already poor economic situation. Pennsylvania state representative Peter Daley pushed for a restoration or replacement of the original bridge, but to no avail, sealing the fate of the area.

It was designated as a historic bridge by the Washington County History & Landmarks Foundation.

== See also ==
- List of crossings of the Monongahela River
