= Cement City Historic District =

Historic district in Pennsylvania, United States

- U.S. National Register of Historic Places
- U.S. Historic district
- Pennsylvania state historical marker
- Washington County History & Landmarks Foundation Landmark
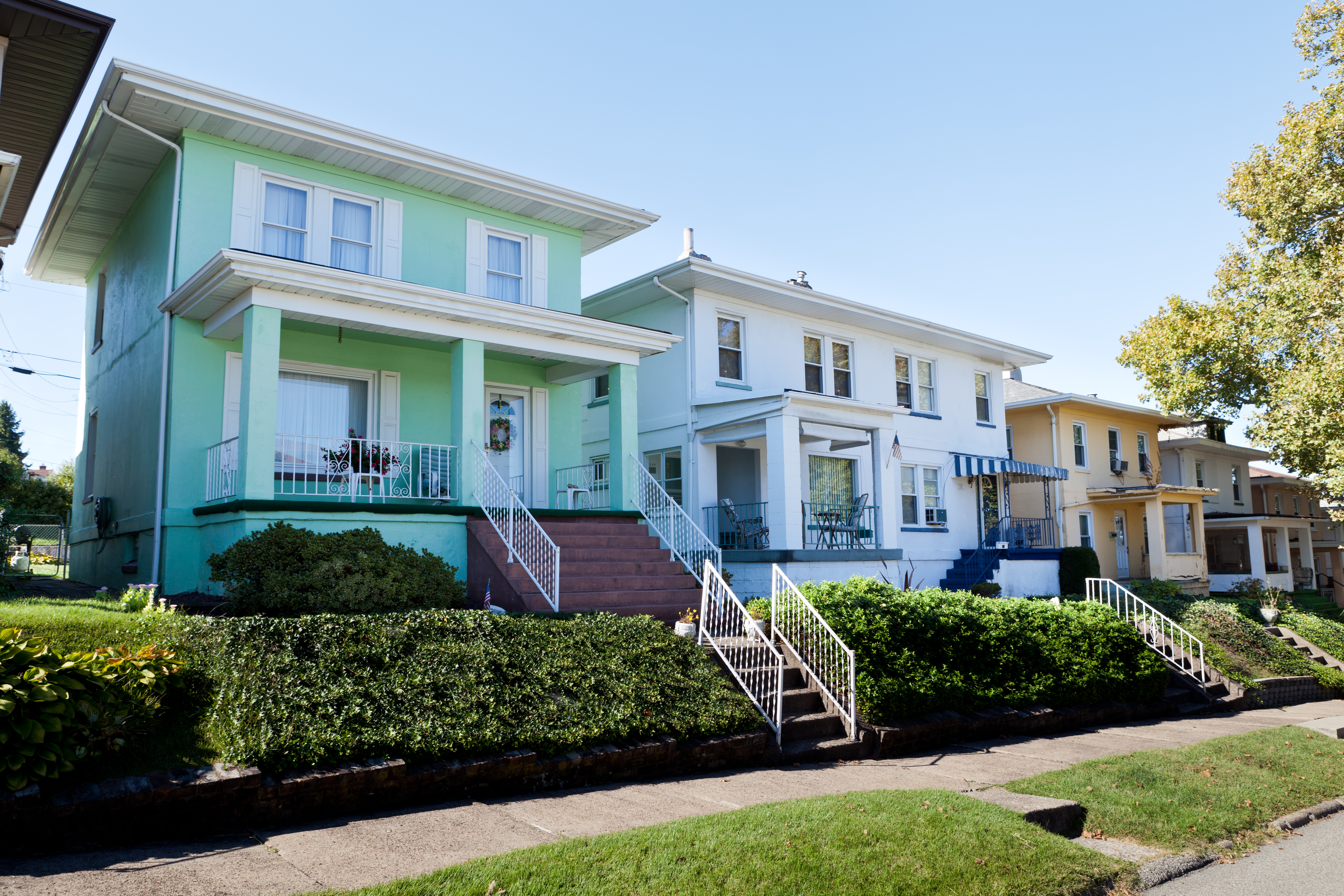

- Location within Pennsylvania Location within the United States
- Location: Roughly, Chestnut and Walnut Sts. from Modisette Ave. to Bertha Ave. and along Ida and Bertha Sts., Donora, Pennsylvania
- Coordinates: 40°10′15″N 79°51′56″W
- Area: 8.8 acres (3.6 ha)
- Built: 1916
- Architect: Lambie Concrete House Corporation; Aberthaw Construction
- Architectural style: Prairie School
- NRHP reference No.: 96000023

Significant dates
- Added to NRHP: February 16, 1996
- Designated PHMC: October 04, 1997

Cement City Historic District is a historic district in Donora, Pennsylvania. The district includes 80 Prairie School concrete residences built in 1916–17. The homes served as housing for employees of the American Steel and Wire Company. Poured-in-place concrete houses had become popular in large-scale housing developments at the time, partly thanks to promotion by Thomas Edison; the homes built in Donora used a newly patented construction method from the Lambie Concrete House Corporation. Building the houses required a combined 10,000 barrels of Portland cement.

It was added to the National Register of Historic Places in 1996. In 1997, the Pennsylvania Historical and Museum Commission installed a historical marker on McKean Ave. (Pa. 837) in South Donora, noting the historic importance of the community. It is designated as a historic district by the Washington County History & Landmarks Foundation. Many of the original cement homes are still standing today, and currently serve as private residences.
