= Air pollution in Karachi =

Karachi is the largest city in Pakistan and the 12th largest city in the world is facing a significant air pollution problem. The air quality of Karachi has been deteriorating over the years, with pollution levels often exceeding safe limits set by the World Health Organization (WHO).

A 2025 analysis by Climate TRACE of the urban areas with the most people exposed to unhealthy levels of air pollution identified Karachi as the largest.

== Air quality index ==
Karachi's air quality index (AQI) has risen to an unhealthy level of 193, making it the fourth most polluted city in the world. The city's AQI is often among the highest globally, indicating severe levels of air pollution.

Fine particulate matter (PM2.5) plays a major role in air pollution in Karachi. The concentration of PM2.5 in the city has been recorded as 11.8 times higher than WHO's annual air quality guideline value. The 24-hour average PM2.5 in Korangi was 101 ± 45.6 μg/m^{3} and 76.5 ± 38.4 μg/m^{3} in Tibet Center. These levels are significantly higher during winter, suggesting increased combustion activity and reduced wind dispersion.

== Major sources of pollution ==
Major sources of air pollution in Karachi include transport and industrial emissions, waste burning, generators, emissions from refrigerators, dust blowing and stoves used in homes and hotels. 70% of the air pollution in Karachi is emitted by motor vehicles.

The two-stroke engine on rickshaws and motorcycles are one of the major polluters of air in Karachi and rest of Pakistan. The two-stroke engines, as well as defective or poorly maintained vehicles, are major polluters by producing carbon dioxide emissions. Two-stroke engines as well as defective vehicles using substandard lubricant are major emitters of sulfur dioxide and smoke. Automobiles operating on compressed natural gas and liquefied petroleum gas are major air polluters.

== Environmental impact ==
Karachi's environment has been badly affected by air pollution. All types of forests along Sindh's coastline, including mangroves, which used to help absorb carbon dioxide and clean air in Karachi, have dwindled to alarming levels. Over the past 50 years, Karachi has lost 10,000 hectares of mangrove forests to encroachment, commercialization and infrastructure development.

== Biochemical and environmental engineering perspectives ==
The severe air quality degradation in Karachi is not merely a matter of visible smoke, but involves complex atmospheric chemistry. Industrial emissions from the Korangi and SITE areas release high volumes of volatile organic compounds (VOCs) and nitrogen oxides (NOx). Under sunlight, these undergo photochemical reactions to form secondary organic aerosols (SOAs), which significantly contribute to the city's hazardous PM2.5 levels.

From an engineering standpoint, mitigating this requires transitioning from basic filtration to advanced emission control technologies. Industries must adopt wet scrubbers and biofilters to neutralize acidic gases and degrade VOCs at the source.

Furthermore, the biochemical role of Karachi’s remaining coastal mangrove forests is critical; these ecosystems act as natural biofilters, sequestering carbon and trapping airborne particulate matter. Preserving and expanding these green belts is a vital, nature-based biochemical engineering strategy to offset urban emissions.

== Government response ==
Despite the alarming situation, the claims of the federal and government of Sindhs to invest heavily in the city to improve the environment and public health are nothing but lies and misinformation. In light of deteriorating air quality, Sindh Caretaker Chief Minister Justice (Rtd) Maqbool Baqar has appealed to the public to ensure the use of face masks.

== See also ==
- Air pollution in Lahore
- Air pollution in Peshawar
- Air pollution in Islamabad
