= Donora Smog Museum =

History museum in Donora, Pennsylvania

- Established: 20 October 2008
- Location: Donora, Pennsylvania
- Coordinates: 40.1776°N 79.8567°W
- Website: www.sites.google.com/site/donorahistoricalsociety/smog-museum/museum

The Donora Smog Museum features a collection of archival materials documenting the Donora Smog of 1948, an air inversion of smog containing fluorine that killed 20 people in Donora, Pennsylvania, United States, a mill town 20 miles south of Pittsburgh on the Monongahela River.

Donora was home to U.S. Steel's Donora Zinc Works and its American Steel & Wire plant. The event is sometimes credited for initiating the clean-air movement in the United States, whose crowning achievement was the Clean Air Act.

The museum, which opened October 20, 2008, is located at 595 McKean Avenue near Sixth Street in an old storefront.

The museum has partnered with California University of Pennsylvania to develop a digital collection of primary sources that are archived on site.

== See also ==
- Great Smog of 1952
