= Air pollution in Islamabad =

Islamabad, the capital of Pakistan, is suffering from air pollution problems. Air quality in the city fluctuates with periods of significant pollution followed by periods of relatively clean air.

== Rise in air pollution ==
The increase in air pollution in Islamabad is attributed to various factors, including dry weather, increased vehicular emissions and human activities. The onset of the winter season often leads to the formation of dust in the atmosphere, which increases the level of pollution. The Pakistan Environmental Protection Agency (Pak-EPA) has noted that the air pollution ratio recorded during certain periods was higher than the permissible limit. Hazardous air pollution particles of 2.5 microns (PM2.5), a deadly environmental pollutant, have been recorded at levels higher than the National Environmental Quality Standards (NEQS) of 35 micrograms per cubic meter.

== Health impact ==
Due to the increase in air pollution, respiratory diseases have increased among the residents of Islamabad. Dry and cold air, the main causes of respiratory diseases in winter, causes disruption of the lining of the respiratory tract], leading to infection and damage to the normal secretions inside the respiratory organs. An increase in cases of respiratory complications and people experiencing difficulty breathing has been reported.

== Air quality ==
=== Declining ===
Air quality in Islamabad has seen intermittent declines, with pollution levels reaching unhealthy levels. Harmful air pollution PM2.5, which comes from engine combustion, industrial emissions, burning of garbage or combustible materials, and dust blown by speeding cars on uncemented patches of road, ranks high. The level is recorded. Compared to National Environmental Quality Standards (NEQS).

=== Improvement ===
Despite the challenges, there were periods when the air quality in Islamabad improved and was considered healthy. This improvement is due to the longer rainy season, which helps limit the amount of pollution in the atmosphere and reduces vehicle emissions during the lockdown. However, as normal activities resume, air quality deteriorates again.

=== Current situation ===
As of June 2022, the air quality in Islamabad was reported to be unhealthy due to persistent hot dry weather and increased vehicular traffic on the roads. The pollution ratio was recorded above the permissible limit, indicating the need for continuous efforts to improve air quality.

== See also ==
- Air pollution in Peshawar
- Air pollution in Karachi
- Air pollution in Lahore
