= Donora, Pennsylvania =

Borough in Pennsylvania, US

- Borough
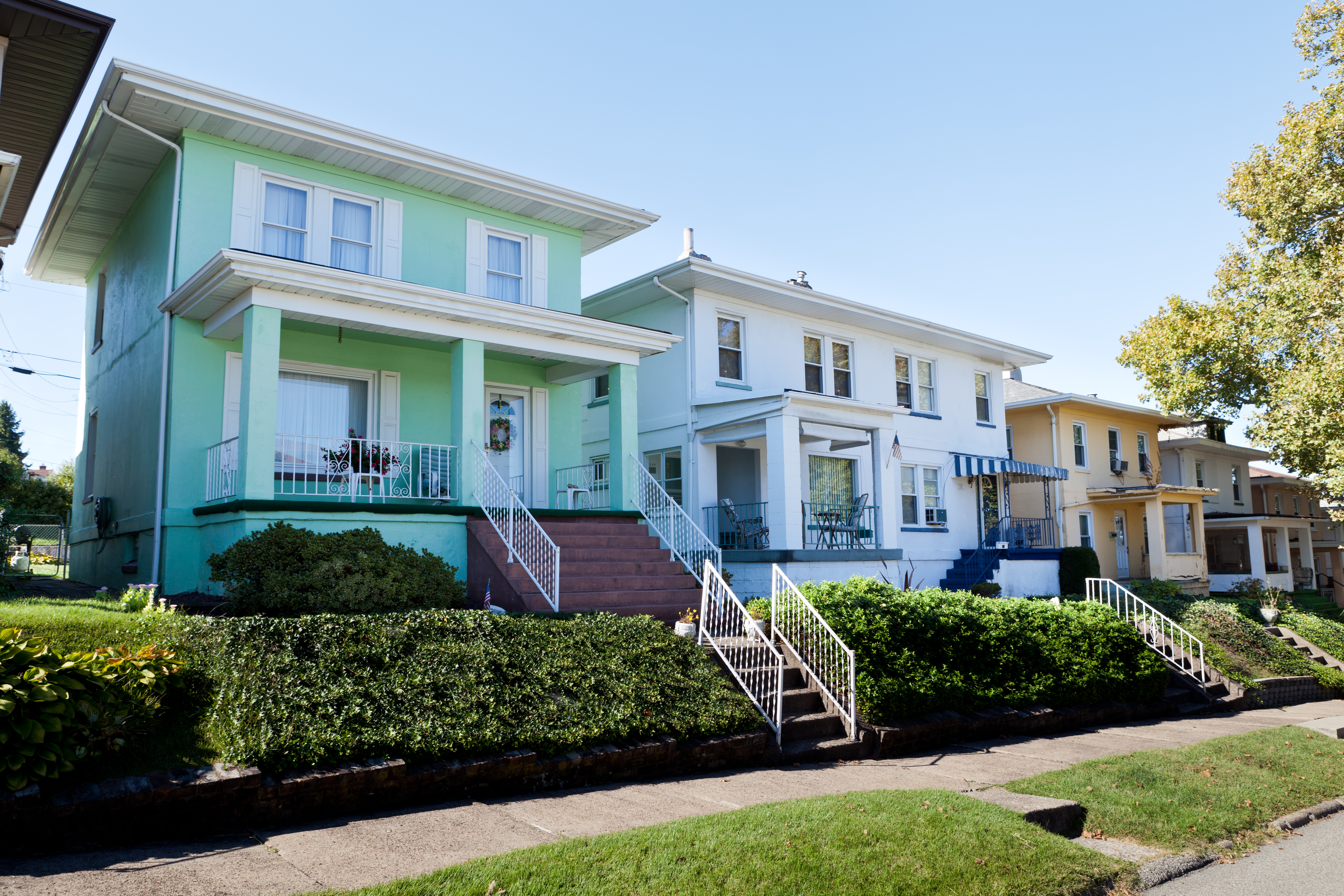
- Concrete houses in the Cement City neighborhood
- Etymology: Portmanteau of "William Donner" and "Nora Mellon"
- Location of Donora in Washington County, Pennsylvania.

- Location in Pennsylvania Location in the United States
- Coordinates: 40°10′33″N 79°51′41″W
- Country: United States
- State: Pennsylvania
- County: Washington
- Established: 1900

Government
  - Mayor: Donald Pavelko

Area
  - Total: 2.05 sq mi (5.30 km^{2})
  - Land: 1.90 sq mi (4.92 km^{2})
  - Water: 0.15 sq mi (0.38 km^{2})

Population (2020)
  - Total: 4,569
  - Density: 2,405.4/sq mi (928.72/km^{2})
- Time zone: UTC−5 (EST)
  - Summer (DST): UTC−4 (EDT)
- ZIP Code: 15033
- Area code: 724
- FIPS code: 42-19536
- Website: DonoraBoro.org

Donora is a borough in Washington County, Pennsylvania, United States, approximately 20 miles (32 km) south of Pittsburgh along the Monongahela River. The population was 4,558 as of the 2020 census.

Donora was incorporated in 1901. It takes its name from a portmanteau of tin plate and steel magnate William Donner and Nora Mellon (1878–1973), wife of banker Andrew W. Mellon. The borough's nickname is "The Home of Champions", mainly because of the large number of famous athletes who have called Donora their home, including Baseball Hall of Fame outfielders Stan Musial and Ken Griffey Jr.

During the 1948 Donora smog, air pollution killed 20 people and caused respiratory problems for 6,000 of the 14,000 residents. Agriculture, coal-mining, steel-making, wire-making, and other industries were important to Donora early in its history; its Rust Belt location has lost most of its industrial capacity. It is in the "Mon Valley", 5 miles (8.0 km) downriver from Charleroi and 25 miles (40 km) upstream of Braddock. In 1911 Donora was the 3rd wealthiest borough in the United States.

== History ==
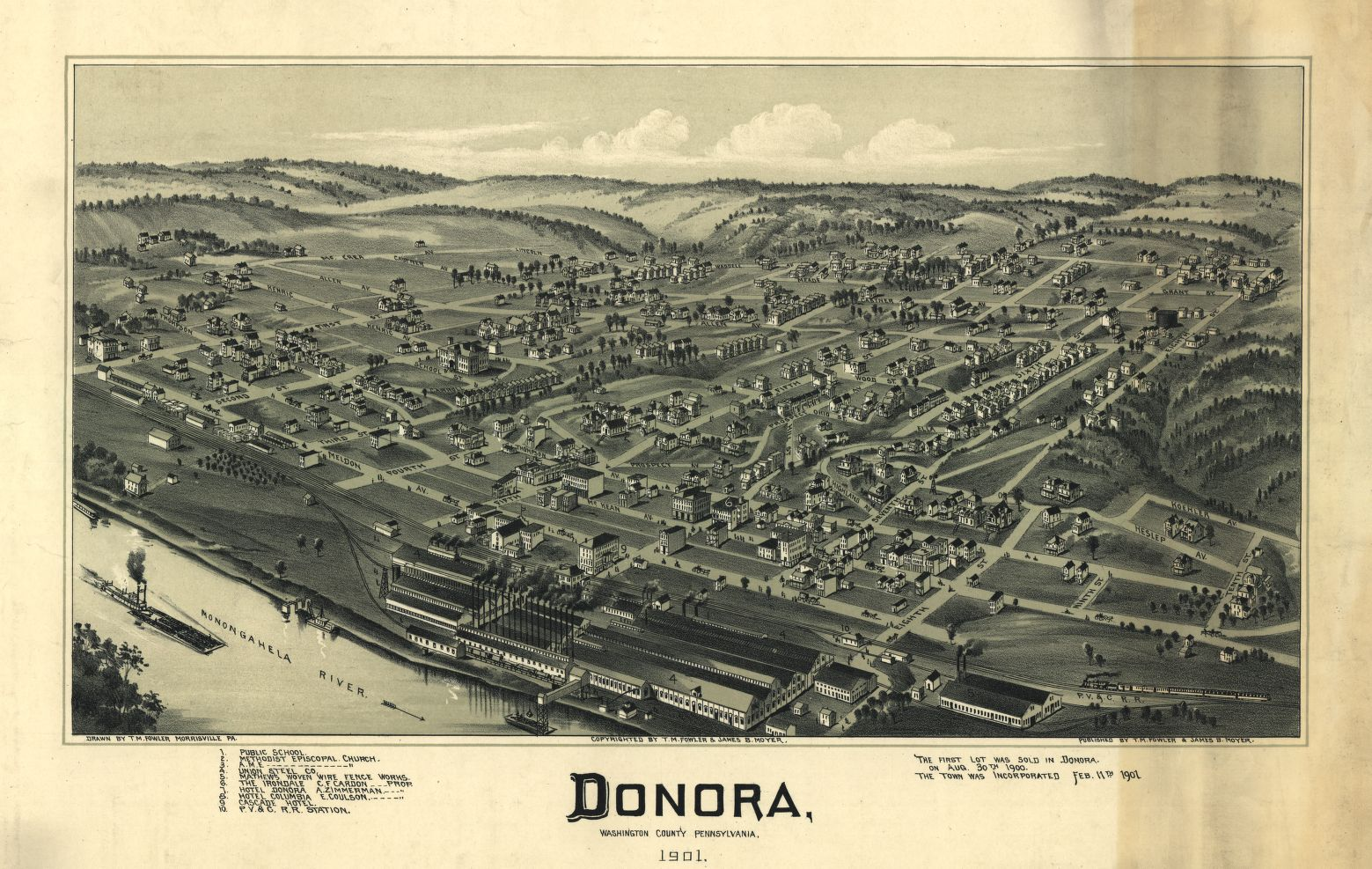
A pictorial map of Donora from 1901

Participants in the Whiskey Rebellion held several meetings in 1794 at Fells Church, approximately 1 mile (1.6 km) east of Donora.

A trolley line opened in Donora on December 15, 1901, linking First and McKean, and Fifteenth Street and Meldon. It was extended in 1911 to Black Diamond to connect to the Charleroi to Pittsburgh interurban trolley. The line was abandoned on May 5, 1953.

The town was the scene of the infamous Donora Smog of 1948, when a temperature inversion trapped industrial emissions from the American Steel and Wire plant and Donora Zinc Works between October 26 and October 31, 1948. During this spike in air pollution, 6,000 people suffered respiratory problems and extreme discomfort. "In three days, 20 people died... After the inversion lifted, another 50 died, including Lukasz Musial, the father of baseball great Stan Musial. Hundreds more finished the rest of their lives with damaged lungs and hearts." The incident made national headlines. Today, the town is home to the Donora Smog Museum, which tells the impact of the Donora Smog on the air quality standards enacted by the federal government in subsequent years.

Donora is home to "Cement City", 80 "poured in place" concrete homes built in the early 1900s as employee housing for the Donora Wire and Steel Mill using a modular method championed by Thomas Edison. The world's second largest such housing tract, the Cement City Historic District is listed on the National Register of Historic Places, along with the Webster Donora Bridge.

The Borough of Donora and surrounding areas have also been utilized as the filming location for several films and television shows, including most recently the American television drama series American Rust in 2021.

== Geography ==
Donora is located at 40°10′33″N 79°51′41″W (40.175879, −79.861264).

According to the United States Census Bureau, the borough has a total area of 2.0 square miles (5.2 km^{2}), of which 1.9 square miles (4.9 km^{2}) is land and 0.2 square miles (0.5 km^{2}) (7.32%) is water.

=== Climate ===
The climate in this area is characterized by hot, humid summers and generally mild to cool winters. According to the Köppen Climate Classification system, Donora has a humid subtropical climate, abbreviated "Cfa" on climate maps.

Climate data for Donora, Pennsylvania (1991–2020 normals, extremes 1926–present)
Month	Jan	Feb	Mar	Apr	May	Jun	Jul	Aug	Sep	Oct	Nov	Dec	Year
Record high °F (°C)	78 (26)	79 (26)	88 (31)	92 (33)	96 (36)	101 (38)	105 (41)	105 (41)	103 (39)	95 (35)	85 (29)	77 (25)	105 (41)
Mean daily maximum °F (°C)	38.7 (3.7)	42.1 (5.6)	50.9 (10.5)	64.0 (17.8)	73.1 (22.8)	80.7 (27.1)	84.4 (29.1)	83.5 (28.6)	77.5 (25.3)	66.0 (18.9)	53.7 (12.1)	43.2 (6.2)	63.2 (17.3)
Daily mean °F (°C)	29.6 (−1.3)	31.9 (−0.1)	39.7 (4.3)	51.2 (10.7)	61.1 (16.2)	69.4 (20.8)	73.3 (22.9)	72.1 (22.3)	65.7 (18.7)	54.1 (12.3)	43.1 (6.2)	34.4 (1.3)	52.1 (11.2)
Mean daily minimum °F (°C)	20.5 (−6.4)	21.8 (−5.7)	28.6 (−1.9)	38.4 (3.6)	49.0 (9.4)	58.1 (14.5)	62.2 (16.8)	60.7 (15.9)	53.9 (12.2)	42.2 (5.7)	32.5 (0.3)	25.7 (−3.5)	41.1 (5.1)
Record low °F (°C)	−19 (−28)	−14 (−26)	−2 (−19)	11 (−12)	22 (−6)	37 (3)	40 (4)	38 (3)	31 (−1)	17 (−8)	−1 (−18)	−11 (−24)	−19 (−28)
Average precipitation inches (mm)	2.90 (74)	2.43 (62)	3.14 (80)	3.40 (86)	4.30 (109)	4.39 (112)	4.31 (109)	3.64 (92)	3.55 (90)	3.05 (77)	2.84 (72)	2.90 (74)	40.85 (1,038)
Average snowfall inches (cm)	5.7 (14)	7.2 (18)	4.6 (12)	0.1 (0.25)	0.0 (0.0)	0.0 (0.0)	0.0 (0.0)	0.0 (0.0)	0.0 (0.0)	0.0 (0.0)	0.5 (1.3)	3.3 (8.4)	21.4 (54)
Average precipitation days (≥ 0.01 in)	15.4	11.9	12.8	13.7	13.7	12.5	11.3	10.2	9.7	11.5	11.6	13.1	147.4
Average snowy days (≥ 0.1 in)	5.3	3.7	1.9	0.2	0.0	0.0	0.0	0.0	0.0	0.0	0.4	2.9	14.4
Source: NOAA

=== Surrounding and adjacent neighborhoods ===
Donora is only bordered by land, with Carroll Township to the north, south and west. Donora sits across the Monongahela River to the east from Rostraver Township in Westmoreland County.

== Demographics ==
Historical population
Census	Pop.	Note	%±
1910	8,174		—
1920	14,131		72.9%
1930	13,905		−1.6%
1940	13,180		−5.2%
1950	12,186		−7.5%
1960	11,131		−8.7%
1970	8,825		−20.7%
1980	7,524		−14.7%
1990	5,928		−21.2%
2000	5,653		−4.6%
2010	4,781		−15.4%
2020	4,569		−4.4%
2025 (est.)	4,462	▼	−2.3%

=== 2020 census ===
As of the 2020 census, Donora had a population of 4,569. The median age was 42.3 years. 20.3% of residents were under the age of 18 and 19.9% of residents were 65 years of age or older. For every 100 females there were 96.6 males, and for every 100 females age 18 and over there were 92.6 males age 18 and over.

100.0% of residents lived in urban areas, while 0.0% lived in rural areas.

There were 2,153 households in Donora, of which 22.8% had children under the age of 18 living in them. Of all households, 29.1% were married-couple households, 27.5% were households with a male householder and no spouse or partner present, and 36.9% were households with a female householder and no spouse or partner present. About 42.2% of all households were made up of individuals and 16.7% had someone living alone who was 65 years of age or older.

There were 2,554 housing units, of which 15.7% were vacant. The homeowner vacancy rate was 2.1% and the rental vacancy rate was 14.3%.

Racial composition as of the 2020 census
Race	Number	Percent
White	3,460	75.7%
Black or African American	636	13.9%
American Indian and Alaska Native	7	0.2%
Asian	10	0.2%
Native Hawaiian and Other Pacific Islander	0	0.0%
Some other race	60	1.3%
Two or more races	396	8.7%
Hispanic or Latino (of any race)	103	2.3%

=== 2000 census ===
As of the 2000 census, there were 5,653 people, 2,469 households, and 1,434 families residing in the borough. The population density was 2,973.8 people per square mile (1,148.2 people/km^{2}). There were 2,958 housing units at an average density of 1,556.1 per square mile (600.8/km^{2}). The racial makeup of the borough was 82.10% White, 14.84% African American, 0.14% Native American, 0.27% Asian, 0.02% Pacific Islander, 0.32% from other races, and 2.32% from two or more races. Hispanic or Latino people of any race were 2.02% of the population.

There were 2,469 households, out of which 23.4% had children under the age of 18 living with them, 36.9% were married couples living together, 16.5% had a female householder with no husband present, and 41.9% were non-families. 37.4% of all households were made up of individuals, and 21.3% had someone living alone who was 65 years of age or older. The average household size was 2.23 and the average family size was 2.95.

In the borough the population was spread out, with 21.7% under the age of 18, 6.4% from 18 to 24, 25.5% from 25 to 44, 21.4% from 45 to 64, and 25.0% who were 65 years of age or older. The median age was 42 years. For every 100 females, there were 82.7 males. For every 100 females age 18 and over, there were 78.4 males.

The median income for a household in the borough was $27,939, and the median income for a family was $37,176. Males had a median income of $33,725 versus $22,346 for females. The per capita income for the borough was $17,893. About 12.4% of families and 16.8% of the population were below the poverty line, including 28.2% of those under age 18 and 14.0% of those age 65 or over.

== Economy ==
Though many group Donora in a class of Western Pennsylvania towns and cities known collectively as the "Rust Belt" because of the demise of the once prolific steel industry, the town continues to be a center for industry and manufacturing. On the site of the former steel mills now stands a large industrial park with nearly 30 tenants that is managed by MMIDA (Mid Mon Valley Industrial Development Authority).

== Government ==
Donora is a borough and consists of an elected mayor and an elected borough council. For nearly three decades, John "Chummy" Lignelli was the mayor of the Borough of Donora, until he retired at age 93. The current mayor is Donald Pavelko.

== Education ==
Donora is part of Ringgold School District, which includes the municipalities of Donora, Monongahela, Carroll Township, Nottingham Township, New Eagle, Finleyville, and Union Township.

== Notable people ==
- Frances Dorothy Acomb, historian and academic
- Mary Amdur, scientist, investigated the 1948 Donora smog
- Devra Davis, scientist and activist
- Steve Filipowicz, professional football and baseball player
- Arnold Galiffa, All-American and professional football player player; inductee to the College Football Hall of Fame
- Ken Griffey Jr., Baseball Hall of Fame centerfielder
- Ken Griffey Sr., Major League Baseball player; his father was Joseph "Buddy" Griffey, a local athlete who was a teammate of Stan Musial on the Donora High School baseball team
- Stan Musial, baseball player with the St. Louis Cardinals and an inductee to the Baseball Hall of Fame
- Dan Towler, running back for the Los Angeles Rams
