= Air pollution in Lahore =

Environmental concern in Punjab, Pakistan

Air Pollution in Lahore
- Date: Recurring
- Location: Lahore, Punjab, Pakistan
- Type: Environmental issue
- Air pollution outbreak in November 2024 recorded the highest AQI of 1900 in the outskirts of the city in areas like DHA phase 8 of Lahore. The government shut down schools and told all people to stay inside to stop people from getting sick due to the bad air quality

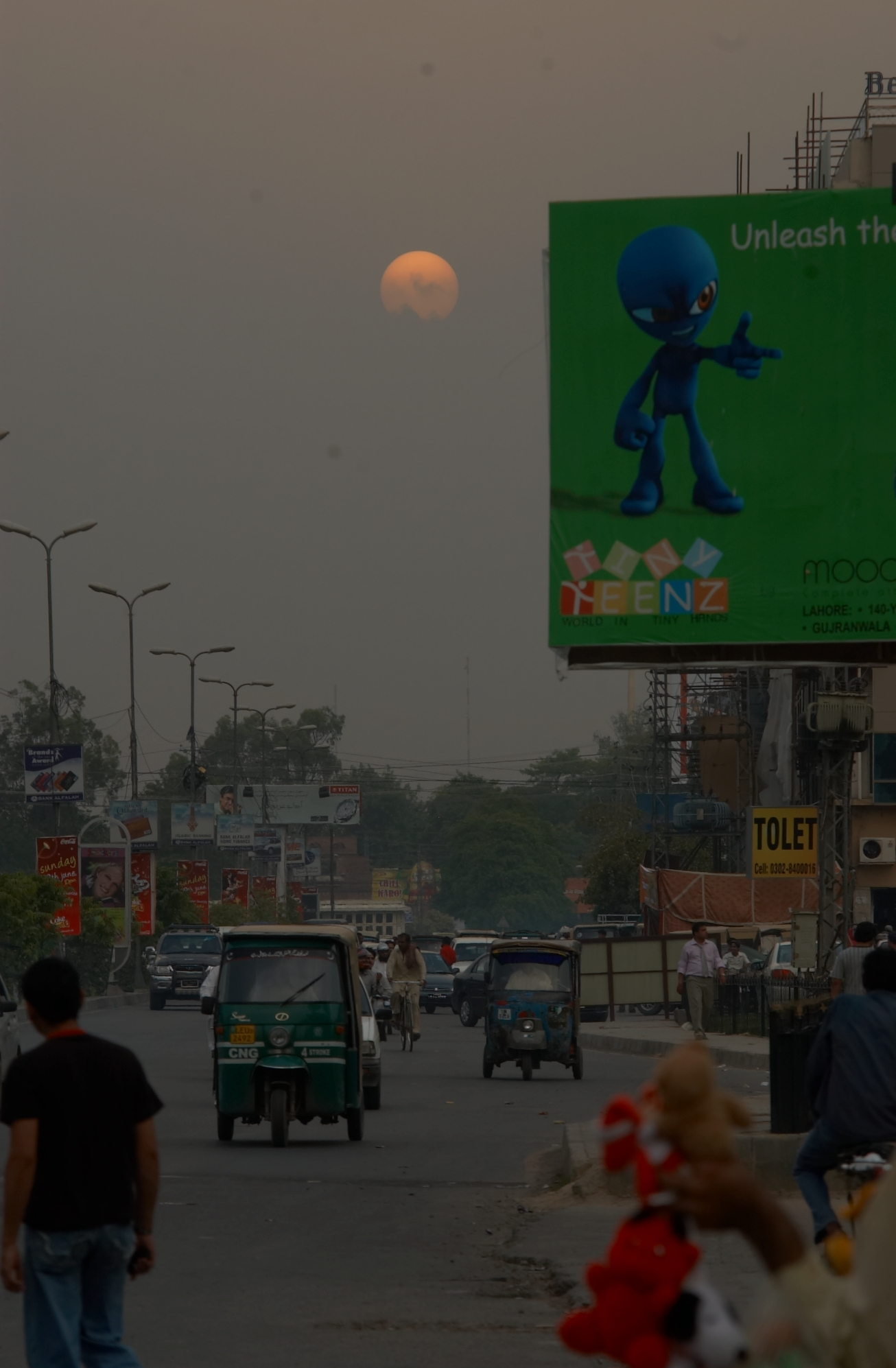
An afternoon in Lahore in 2008 looks almost like nighttime due to smog blocking the sun's light.

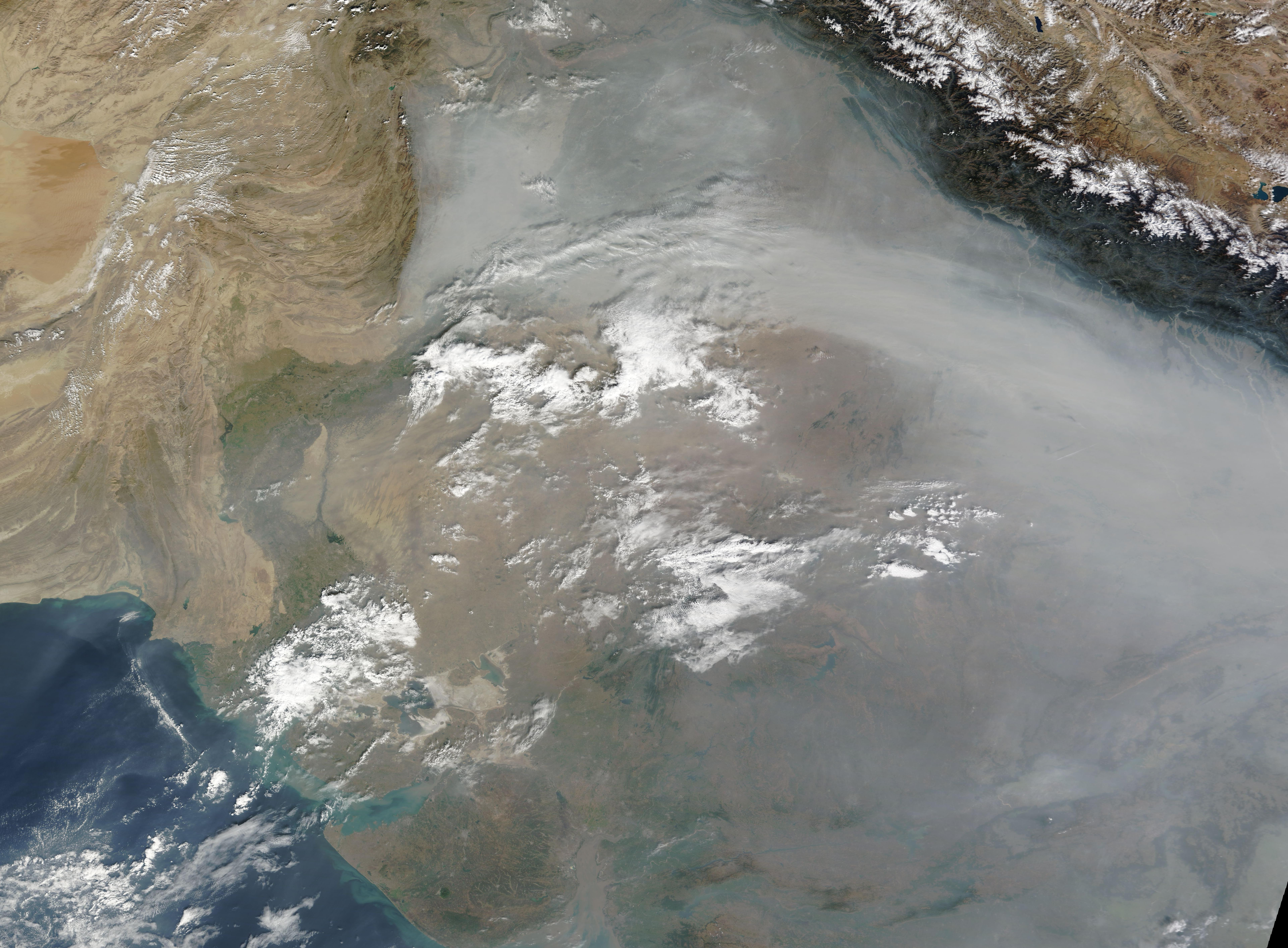
Smog over eastern Pakistan and northwestern India is visible in this 2023 satellite photo from space.

Air pollution in Lahore, Punjab, Pakistan is a recurring issue.

== Causes ==
Causes may include agricultural burning, vehicle emissions, and factory emissions. In November 2024, certain high-smog devices were temporarily banned, including unfiltered barbeques at restaurants and auto rickshaws. Pakistan has blamed India for air pollution, however Pakistani citizens do not agree.

== Outbreaks ==
=== November 2017 ===
In November 2017 flights were cancelled because of air pollution.

=== January 2019 ===
In January 2019 a smog wave prompted measures to reduce air pollution going forward.

=== April 2020 ===
In April 2020 there was an outbreak of air pollution following the end of a COVID-19 lockdown in Pakistan.

=== November 2021 ===
An outbreak of smog in November 2021 has made it difficult for citizens to breathe and colds, flu are common. While according to the latest statistics, Lahore is in the top contenders in terms of air pollution. The highest 680 AQI was recorded in Kot Lakhpat area of Lahore.

5 special squads have been formed to fight smog, Metropolitan Corporation Lahore, Water and Sanitation Agency (Wasa), police, district administration and Lahore Electric Supply Company (Lesco) Lahore jumped more than 10 places to become the city with the worst air in the world in 2021, according to an annual global survey by a Swiss maker of air purifiers.

=== November 2023 ===
In November 2023, smog in Lahore hovered around the 400 AQI. The smog sickened tens of thousands of people. The Punjab provincial government ordered schools, offices, malls, and parks in three cities, including Lahore, to be closed. Medical facilities, grocery stores and gas stations remained open. Authorities advised residents to wear masks if they must go outside.

=== November 2024 ===
In November 2024, on Saturday morning, smog in Lahore skyrocketed to precisely 1067 AQI, generally in Lahore with 1902 AQI index in some parts of Mall Road and Samanabad. The smog sickened tens of thousands of people, however no official death toll was announced. The Punjab provincial government ordered schools, offices, malls, and parks in three cities, including Lahore, to be closed, or either to be in operation under the SOP's required. Medical facilities, grocery stores, and gas stations remained open. Authorities advised residents to wear masks if they must go outside.

=== November 2026 ===
In early November 2026, air quality worsened in regions of northern India and nearby Pakistan, with Lahore emerging as the most polluted city globally. Meanwhile, officials in Delhi implemented measures to address the hazardous smog covering the capital.

== See also ==
- Air pollution in Peshawar
- Air pollution in Karachi
- Air pollution in Islamabad
