= Donora–Monessen Bridge =

Bridge in Pennsylvania, USA

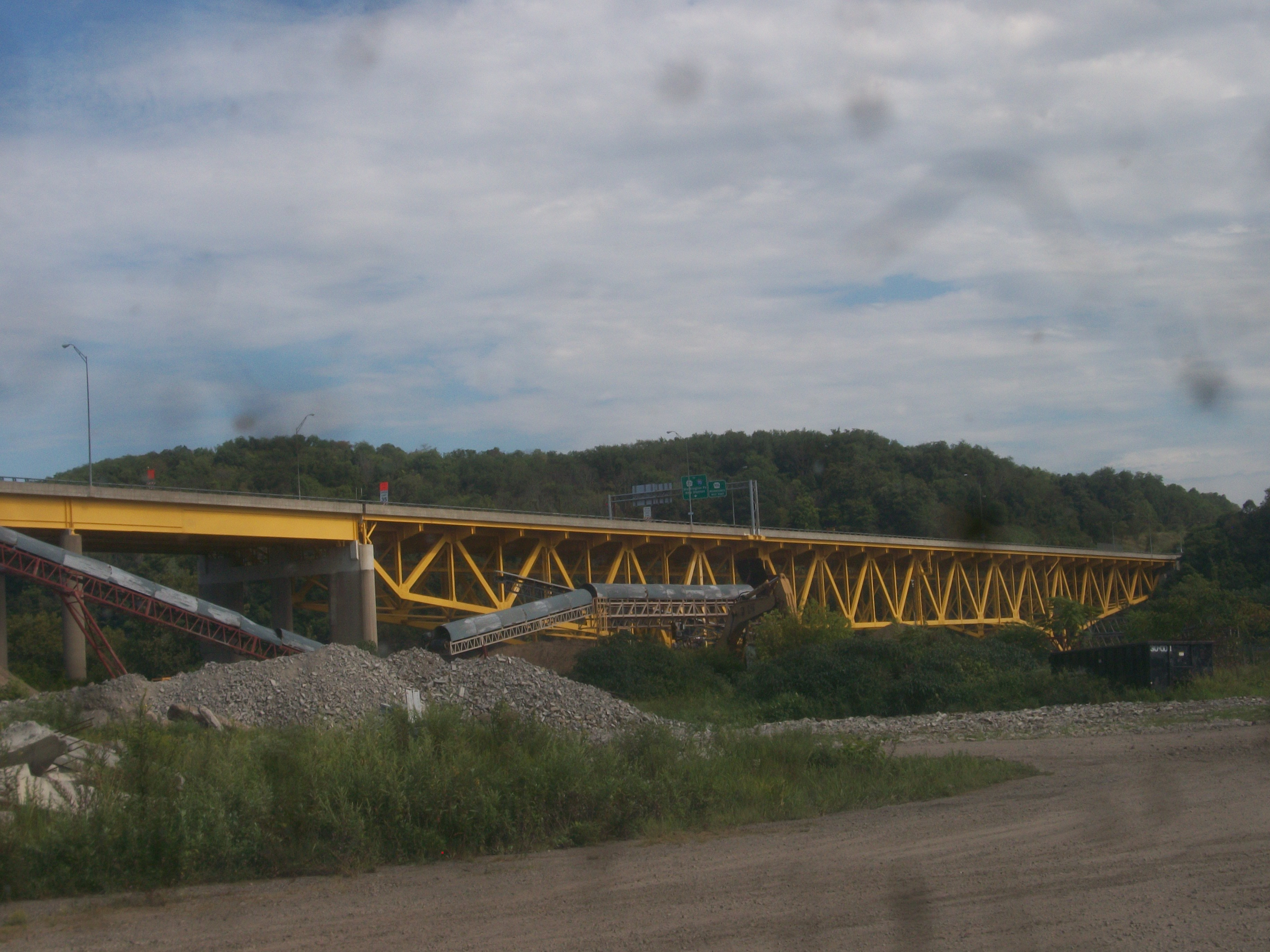
- Coordinates: 40.1625°N 79.8615°W
- Carries: 4 divided lanes of SR 1077
- Crosses: Monongahela River
- Locale: Donora, Pennsylvania and Monessen, Pennsylvania
- Official name: Stan Musial Bridge

Characteristics
- Design: Truss bridge
- Material: Steel
- Total length: 2,141.1 feet (652.6 m)
- Width: 75.5 feet (23.0 m)
- Longest span: 680.2 feet (207.3 m)
- Piers in water: 2

History
- Opened: 1972

The Donora–Monessen Bridge, officially known as the Stan Musial Bridge, is a truss bridge that carries vehicles across the Monongahela River between Donora and Monessen in Pennsylvania, U.S.A. The bridge was built in 1972, as part of a 1960s-era project to increase access to the industrial Monongahela Valley through a semi-freeway connection to Interstate 70. However, the decline of the steel sector halted area road construction, and the entire project was not completed until 1989. The road was originally named for former State Engineer C. Vance DeiCas.

In 2011, a bill was introduced in the Pennsylvania House of Representatives to rename the structure for Baseball Hall of Fame member Stan Musial, a Donora native. Effective January 8, 2012, Musial's name adorned the bridge.
