= Firecrackers in India =

Laws on use of firecrackers

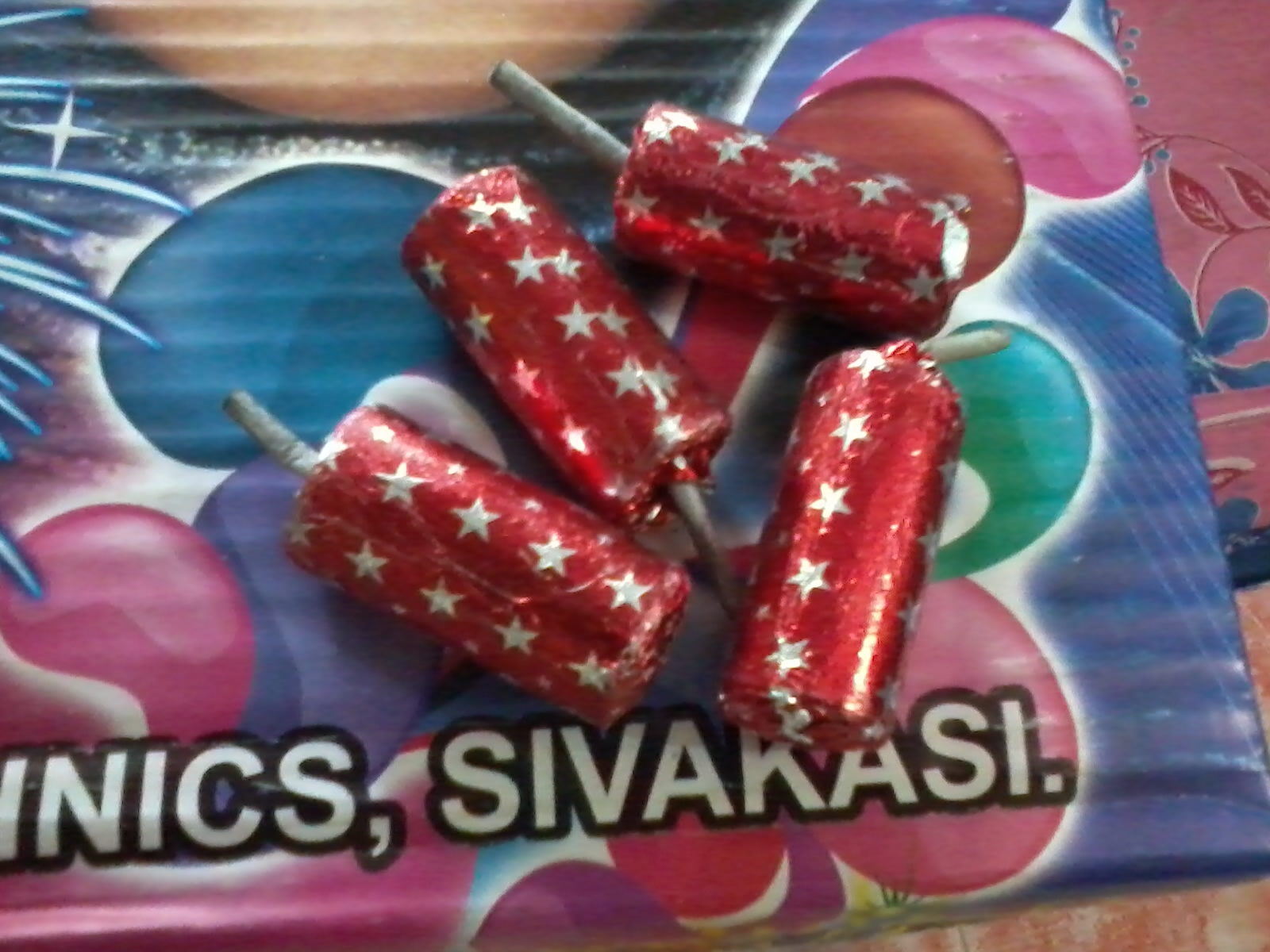
Firecracker

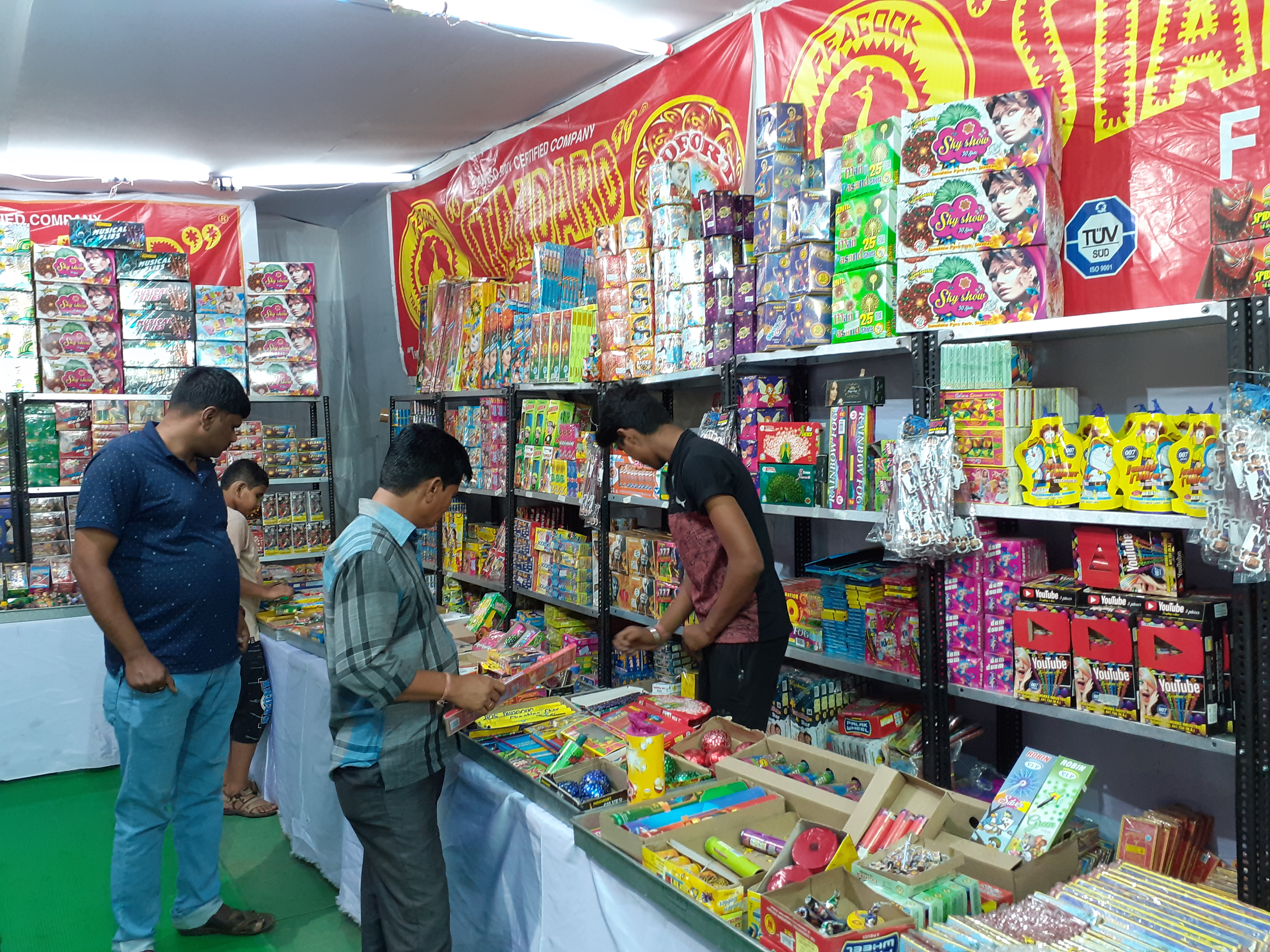
Firecracker shop on Diwali

A firecracker (cracker, noise maker, banger,) is a small explosive device primarily designed to produce a large amount of noise, especially in the form of a loud bang, usually for celebration or entertainment. They have fuses, and are wrapped in a heavy paper casing to contain the explosive compound. Firecrackers, along with fireworks, originated in China. They are easily available in India and are used to mark a celebratory event. Anyone 18 and over can buy them without a license if allowed by the local laws.

Diwali fireworks are a family event in many parts of India. People light up fireworks near their homes and in streets. Additionally, cities and communities have community fireworks.

== History ==
This custom may have begun on the Indian subcontinent during 15th century when gunpowder started being utilised in Indian warfare following the Islamic conquest of the Indian subcontinent.

India's first fireworks factory was established in Calcutta during the 19th century.

== Pollution concerns ==
In October and November, farmers from Punjab and Haryana burn stubble and other agricultural waste and the weather tends not to be windy, so Delhi's air pollution usually increases, which has been a major environmental problem since 2002. Toxic smog generated during the burning of the firecrackers during Diwali festival can worsen this pollution.

== Ban on firecrackers ==
In October 2017, the Supreme Court banned firecrackers in Delhi, as a result of which the industry said it faced losses of Rs 1,000-crore and consequently layoffs.

After India's National Green Tribunal (NGT) ordered a ban in the NCR region on the sale and use of crackers in 2020, the Council for Scientific and Industrial Research (CSIR) developed "green crackers" that used less polluting raw materials. Several states in India have either banned firecrackers or limited the time, noise level and type (mandatory use of less polluting firecrackers) that can be used. Nonetheless, many firecrackers were used to celebrate the Diwali holiday in 2020, immediately after which Delhi's air pollution was over 9 times the level that the World Health Organization considers safe.

Researchers at Edward & Cynthia Institute of Public Health put out a working paper which spoke about the hazards of firecrackers in Mangalore and parts of the country and called for an immediate regulation of hours of bursting and eventual phase out with a full ban.

Aaratrika Bhaumik mentions the ban put in place by the Calcutta High Court on firecrackers (green firecrackers included) throughout the state of West Bengal for the 2021 Diwali and Kali Puja festivities. The ban extends to all remaining festivals in the year, such as Chhath Puja, Guru Nanak Jayanti, Diwali, Dasera, Christmas and the New Year.

=== Green or environment friendly firecracker ===
After India's National Green Tribunal (NGT) enacted a ban on the sale and use of crackers on Diwali festival in 2020, the Council for Scientific and Industrial Research (CSIR) developed green crackers made from cleaner raw materials which reduce emissions by suppressing the production of dust; their emissions are 30% lower and are also of reduced loudness at 110-125 decibels instead of the more than 160 decibels of traditional firecrackers. However, green crackers still contain harmful pollutants such as aluminium, barium, potassium nitrate and carbon.

=== 2022 appeal in Supreme Court ===
The Delhi government had decided to stop the production, storage, sale, and use of all types of firecrackers to reduce the rising levels of pollution in Delhi. In September 2022, Manoj Tiwari, a Member of Parliament from the BJP moved the Supreme Court against the Delhi government. Tiwari said that that freedom of religion cannot be taken away under the pretext of the right to life. Supreme Court refused to provide an early hearing for the petition and dismissed the plea saying "Let People Breathe Clean Air". SC also asked the public to use the money on sweets instead of crackers.
