= Climate Change, Forestry, Environment & Wildlife Department, Khyber Pakhtunkhwa =

Department in Khyber Pakhtunkhwa, Pakistan

Climate Change, Forestry, Environment & Wildlife Department
Agency overview
- Formed: 1975
- Jurisdiction: Khyber Pakhtunkhwa, Pakistan
- Website: https://few.kp.gov.pk

The Climate Change, Forestry, Environment & Wildlife Department is a government agency in charge of preserving and managing wildlife in the Khyber Pakhtunkhwa province of Pakistan. Established in 1975, the department operates under the Wildlife Protection Act, which offers legal protection to wildlife and their habitats.

== See also ==
- Forestry, Wildlife and Fisheries department, Punjab
