= Richard Clapp (epidemiologist) =

American epidemiologist

Richard "Dick" Clapp is an American epidemiologist who is an adjunct professor at the University of Massachusetts Lowell and an Emeritus Professor of Environmental Health at Boston University School of Public Health. Clapp was Director of the Massachusetts Cancer Registry from 1980 until 1989 and Co-Chair of Greater Boston Physicians for Social Responsibility.

== History ==
Clapp earned a bachelor's degree in biology from Dartmouth College (1967) a M.P.H., in health services from Harvard School of Public Health (1974), and received his D.Sc., Epidemiology, from Boston University School of Public Health (BUSPH) in 1989. He began teaching at BUSPH in 1992 as an assistant professor of environmental health. In 2004, Clapp became a "senior environmental health scientist at the Lowell Center for Sustainable Production at the University of Massachusetts–Lowell, where he conducts and supervises epidemiologic data analyses, literature reviews, and technical assistance in community-based environmental health studies."

His awards include being named the 2001 "Public Scientist of the Year" by the Association for Science in the Public Interest, and a 2018 Alumni Award of Merit from the Harvard T.H. Chan School of Public Health's Alumni Association.
