= 1930 Meuse Valley fog =

1930 natural disaster

The location of Engis within Belgium.

The 1930 Meuse Valley fog was a severe air pollution incident that occurred from 1–5 December 1930 along parts of the River Meuse in Belgium. It was caused by a combination of airborne industrial pollutants and a localized temperature inversion, which produced respiratory symptoms that negatively affected human health in dozens of towns in the Meuse Valley, ultimately killing 63 people.

The River Meuse flows from France through Belgium and the Netherlands before entering the North Sea. The area in the Meuse Valley where the incident occurred, between the cities of Huy and Liege and centered around the town of Engis, was densely populated and had 27 factories. These factories produced zinc, steel, fertilizer, and explosives, amongst many other products. This was added to by large numbers of coal and wood heaters burning due to unseasonably cold weather. There were several thousand cases of illness over the course of the week and the 63 deaths occurred at the same time, with the first death occurring on 3 December. Fifty-six of the deaths occurred in towns to the east of Engis.

The main symptom was dyspnea (shortness of breath) and the average age of those who died was 62, though the ages of the victims ranged from 20 to 89 years. The youngest, a 20-year-old woman named Louise Dammes, died walking home from a party and may have had undiagnosed asthma that contributed to her death. Cattle in the area were also affected. Danish scientist Kaj Roholm, the world's leading authority on fluorine, determined that the most significant contributor to the respiratory symptoms was fluorine gas emitted from nearby factories. A statue and plaque commemorating those who died were inaugurated in Engis on the seventieth anniversary of the disaster, on 2 December 2000.

Due to a similar (albeit less severe) incident that had occurred in a nearby valley in 1911, which had killed off many cattle, many farmers in the Meuse Valley fled to the hillside during the first two days of the smog, reducing livestock casualties and likely saving the lives of several farmers as well.

== See also ==
- Smog
- 1939 St. Louis smog
- 1948 Donora smog (United States)
- Great Smog of London
- 1966 New York City smog
- 2013 Harbin smog (China, 2013)
- 2024 Indo-Pakistani smog
- Smog in Delhi
