= 1939 St. Louis smog =

Smog event

The 1939 St. Louis smog was a severe smog episode that affected St. Louis, Missouri on November 28, 1939. Visibility was so limited that streetlights remained lit throughout the day and motorists needed their headlights to navigate city streets.

A man lights a cigarette as streetlights along Olive glow during the daytime hours of November 28, 1939. St. Louis Post-Dispatch

== The problem of pollution control ==
Smoke pollution had been a problem in St. Louis for many decades prior to the event, due to the large-scale burning of bituminous (soft) coal to provide heat and power for homes, businesses and transport. In 1893, the Council passed an ordinance prohibiting the emission of "thick grey smoke within the corporate limits of St. Louis" but was unable to enforce it because of failed legal action taken against Heitzberg Packing and Provision Company, one of the worst corporate offenders. The effectiveness of laws was also limited by the lack of adequate inspection and enforcement. In 1933, the mayor, Bernard F. Dickmann, created a "citizen smoke committee" and appointed his personal secretary Raymond Tucker to take charge of efforts to improve air quality.

Early efforts relied on education such as teaching people how to build cleaner fires – but this had almost no impact. It was soon realized that real improvement would only come about by switching to a cleaner fuel – gas, oil, coke, or anthracite were all considered but ruled out on cost grounds. The alternative was to wash and size the existing soft coal to make it burn hotter and cleaner, and ensure that all coal sold in St. Louis was of this variety. In February 1937 a smoke ordinance was passed creating a "Division of Smoke Regulation in the Department of Public Safety", forcing larger businesses to burn only clean coal and setting standards for smoke emission and inspection. By 1938 emissions from commercial smokestacks had been reduced by two-thirds.

Despite some improvement, smoke pollution was still a visible problem since the new law did not cover smaller businesses and domestic users – 97% of homes still used coal. The city council was reluctant to pass further legislation that might alienate voters so the mayor's "enforcer", Tucker, was limited to using persuasion through the press and radio broadcasts. One newspaper in particular, the St. Louis Post-Dispatch, became notable for its campaign to persuade residents of the benefits of switching to cleaner forms of coal.

== The smog episode and its aftermath ==
However, on Tuesday, November 28, 1939, a meteorological temperature inversion trapped emissions from coal burning close to the ground, resulting in "the day the sun didn't shine". A cloud of thick black smoke enveloped St. Louis, far worse than any previously seen in the city. Bituminous coal smoke contains a complex mixture of harmful substances formed during combustion including sulphur dioxide, carbon monoxide and hydrogen fluoride. The day came to be known as "Black Tuesday". The smog hung about for nine days over the course of the following month. This proved to be the catalyst that forced the council's hand. New cleaner, affordable supplies of coal (semi-anthracite) were quickly secured from Arkansas in time for the next winter. This, together with a new smoke ordinance, improvements to the efficiency of furnaces and the ongoing public education campaign resulted in a significant and permanent improvement in air quality in the city.

== See also ==
- 1930 Meuse Valley fog
- Donora Smog of 1948
- 1966 New York City smog
- 2013 Eastern China smog
- 2024 Indo-Pakistani smog
- Great Smog of London
- Pea soup fog
- Jewel Box (St. Louis, Missouri), a municipal greenhouse that was built because of high smog and soot levels
