= 1948 Donora smog =

Major air pollution incident in Pennsylvania

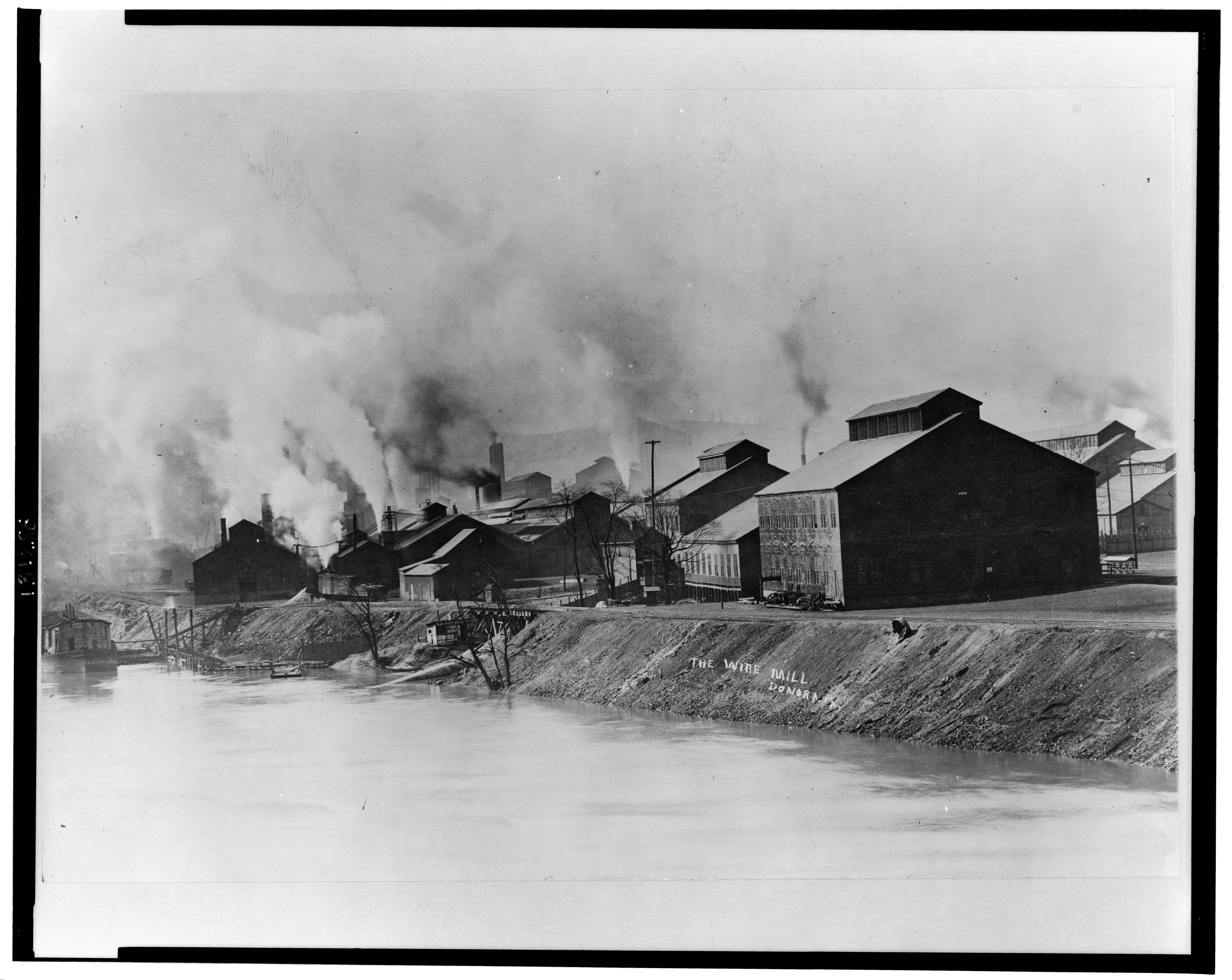
- The wire mill, Donora 1910

- Location within Pennsylvania
- 40.17624°N 79.85547°W

The 1948 Donora smog, also called the Donora death fog, was an air pollution disaster that occurred in Donora, Pennsylvania, beginning on October 27, 1948, and lasting several days. It was caused by hydrogen fluoride and sulfur dioxide emissions from U.S. Steel's Donora Zinc Works and its American Steel & Wire plant during an atmospheric temperature inversion. It killed 20 people and caused respiratory problems for more than 6,000 of the 14,000 people living in Donora, a mill town on the Monongahela River 24 miles (39 km) southeast of Pittsburgh. The event is commemorated by the Donora Smog Museum.

Sixty years later, the incident was described by The New York Times as "one of the worst air pollution disasters in the nation's history." Even 10 years after the incident, mortality rates in Donora were significantly higher than those in other communities nearby.

== Incident ==
Hydrogen fluoride and sulfur dioxide emissions from U.S. Steel's Donora Zinc Works and its American Steel & Wire plant were frequent occurrences in Donora. What made the 1948 event more severe was a temperature inversion, a situation in which warmer air aloft traps pollution in a layer of colder air near the surface. The pollutants in the air mixed with fog to form a thick, yellowish, acrid smog that hung over Donora for five days. The sulfuric acid, nitrogen dioxide, fluorine, and other poisonous gases that usually dispersed into the atmosphere were caught in the inversion and accumulated to lethal concentrations until rainfall washed the pollutants out of the air and ended the weather pattern.

The fog started building up in Donora on Wednesday, October 27, 1948. By the following day, coughing and other signs of respiratory distress were common for many residents of the community in the Monongahela River valley. Many of the illnesses and deaths were initially attributed to asthma. The smog continued until it rained on Sunday, October 31, by which time 20 residents of Donora had died and approximately one-third to one-half of the town's population of 14,000 residents had been sickened. Another 50 residents died of respiratory causes within a month of the initial smog.

Two of the heroes to emerge during the four-day smog were Chief John Volk of the Donora Fire Department and his assistant Russell Davis. Volk and Davis responded to calls from Friday night, October 29 until Sunday night, October 31, depleting their supply of 800 cubic feet (23 m^{3}) of oxygen and compelling them to request more from all nearby municipalities, including McKeesport, Monessen, and Charleroi. "I didn’t take any myself. What I did every time I came back to the station was have a little shot of whiskey."

The eight doctors in the town, who belonged to the Donora Medical Association, made house calls much like the firefighters during the period of intense smog, often visiting the houses of patients who were treated by the other doctors in town. This was a result of patients calling every doctor in town in the hope of getting treatment faster. It was not until midday Saturday, October 30, that Mrs. Cora Vernon, executive director of the American Red Cross, had it set up so that all calls going to the doctors’ offices would be switched to the ad hoc emergency center being established in the town hall. The smog was so intense that visibility in the town was extremely low and driving was nearly abandoned; those who chose to continue driving took risks. Davis recalled: “I drove on the left side of the street with my head out the window. Steering by scraping the curb.”

It was not until Sunday morning, October 31, that a meeting occurred between the operators of the plants and the town officials. August Z. Chambon, the burgess (mayor) of Donora, requested the plants temporarily cease operations. The superintendent of the plants, L. J. Westhaver, said the plants had already begun shutting down operation at around 6:00 that morning. With the rain alleviating the smog, the plants resumed normal operation the following morning.

Researchers analyzing the event have focused blame on pollutants from the zinc plant, whose emissions had killed almost all vegetation within a half-mile radius of the plant. Dr. Devra L. Davis, director of the Center for Environmental Oncology at the University of Pittsburgh Cancer Institute, has pointed to autopsy results showing that fluorine levels in victims were within the lethal range, as much as 20 times higher than normal. Fluorine gas generated in the zinc smelting process had become trapped by the stagnant air and was the primary cause of the deaths. Further research was conducted by Mary Amdur about the effects of the smog; she was pressured to withdraw publication of these results but refused to bow.

== Aftermath ==
Preliminary results of a study performed by Clarence A. Mills of the University of Cincinnati and released in December 1948 showed that thousands more Donora residents might have been killed if the smog had lasted any longer than it had. Lawsuits were filed against U.S. Steel, which never acknowledged responsibility for the incident, calling it "an act of God". While the steel company did not accept blame, it reached a settlement in 1951 in which it paid about $235,000 (equivalent to $2,915,000 in 2025), which was distributed between the 80 victims who had participated in the lawsuit, leaving them little after legal expenses were factored in. Representatives of American Steel & Wire settled the more than $4.6 million claimed in 130 damage suits at about 5% of what had been sought, noting that the company was prepared to show at trial that the smog had been caused by a "freak weather condition" that trapped over Donora "all of the smog coming from the homes, railroads, the steamboats, and the exhaust from automobiles, as well as the effluents from its plants." U.S. Steel closed both Denora facilities by 1966.

By 1949, a year after the disaster, the total value of the predominantly residential property in Donora had declined by nearly 10%. The Donora smog was one of the earliest incidents in which Americans recognized that exposure to large amounts of pollution in a short period of time can result in injuries and fatalities. The event is often credited for helping to trigger the clean air movement in the United States, whose crowning achievement was the Clean Air Act of 1963, which required the United States Environmental Protection Agency to develop and enforce regulations to protect the general public from exposure to hazardous airborne contaminants.

The incident was little spoken of in Donora until a historical marker was placed in the town in 1998 to commemorate the 50th anniversary of the incident. The 60th anniversary, in 2008, was commemorated with memorials for the families of the victims and other educational programs. The Donora Smog Museum was opened on October 20, 2008, in an old storefront at 595 McKean Avenue near Sixth Street, with the slogan "Clean Air Started Here". Fewer than 6,000 people still live in Donora.

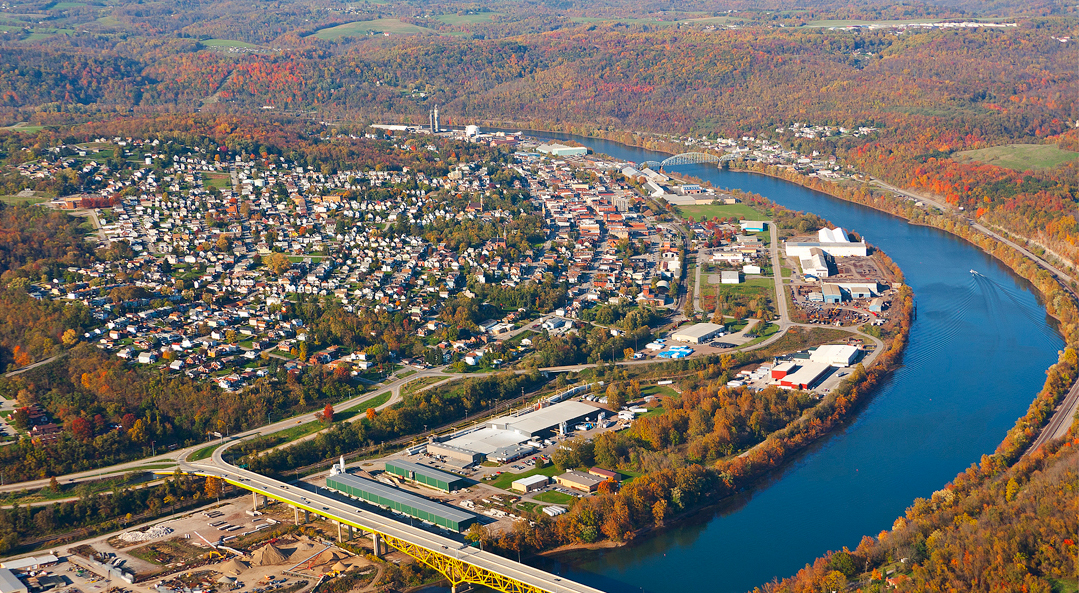
Town of Donora in 2012

== Media coverage and legacy ==
The Donora event led to the first large-scale epidemiological investigation of an environmental health disaster in the United States. An account of the smog was published in 1950 by the noted medical writer Berton Roueché in The New Yorker under the title "The Fog". Together with another article, "A Pig From Jersey" (about a mass-case of foodborne illness), this article won him the 1950 Albert Lasker Medical Journalism Award. "The Fog" was later included in his celebrated collection of short stories Eleven Blue Men. Devra Davis' 2002 novel When Smoke Ran Like Water starts with the Donora smog.

The 2009 novel Don't Kill the Messenger by Joel Pierson features the fictional town of Wyandotte, Pennsylvania becoming a ghost town after a smog incident, which was based on the Donora smog.

The 2023 nonfiction book Donora Death Fog: Clean Air and the Tragedy of a Pennsylvania Mill Town by Andy McPhee was published by the University of Pittsburgh Press. An hour-long documentary, Rumor of Blue Sky, produced by Andrew Maietta and Janet Whitney, aired on WQED TV in April 2009. The film features archival images and interviews with survivors of the environmental tragedy.

The Donora smog incident was mentioned in Netflix's historical drama series The Crown in 2016, when it depicted a similar incident in London in 1952. The Weather Channel produced an episode of When Weather Changed History on the Donora smog incident. The incident was revisited in a later Weather Channel series, Weather That Changed The World. The first episode of the 2024 podcast Cement City, about two journalists who live for three years in Donora, also includes extensive discussion of the 1948 smog incident.

In 1995, the Pennsylvania Historical and Museum Commission installed a historical marker noting the historic importance of the event.

== See also ==
- 1930 Meuse Valley fog
- 1939 St. Louis smog
- 2013 Eastern China smog
- 2024 Indo-Pakistani smog
- Great Smog of London
- Pea soup fog

== Sources ==
- Overview of the 1948 Donora Smog, Pennsylvania Department of Environmental Protection
- Don Hopey (2008). Museum remembers Donora's deadly 1948 smog: story by Pittsburgh Post-Gazette. Retrieved October 21, 2008.
- Weather Channel (2008). When Weather Changed History: Killer Smog. Retrieved November 6, 2008.
