= Air quality law =

Type of law

Air quality laws govern the emission of air pollutants into the atmosphere. A specialized subset of air quality laws regulate the quality of air inside buildings. Air quality laws are often designed specifically to protect human health by limiting or eliminating airborne pollutant concentrations. Other initiatives are designed to address broader ecological problems, such as limitations on chemicals that affect the ozone layer, and emissions trading programs to address acid rain or climate change. Regulatory efforts include identifying and categorising air pollutants, setting limits on acceptable emissions levels, and dictating necessary or appropriate mitigation technologies.

== Air pollutant classification ==
Air quality regulation must identify the substances and energies which qualify as "pollution" for purposes of further control. While specific labels vary from jurisdiction to jurisdiction, there is broad consensus among many governments regarding what constitutes air pollution. For example, the United States Clean Air Act identifies ozone, particulate matter, carbon monoxide, nitrogen oxides (NO_{x}), sulfur dioxide (SO_{2}), and lead (Pb) as "criteria" pollutants requiring nationwide regulation. EPA has also identified over 180 compounds it has classified as "hazardous" pollutants requiring strict control. Other compounds have been identified as air pollutants due to their adverse impact on the environment (e.g., CFCs as agents of ozone depletion), and on human health (e.g., asbestos in indoor air). A broader conception of air pollution may also incorporate noise, light, and radiation. The United States has recently seen controversy over whether carbon dioxide (CO_{2}) and other greenhouse gases should be classified as air pollutants.

== Air quality standards ==
Air quality standards are legal standards or requirements governing concentrations of air pollutants in breathed air, both outdoors and indoors. Such standards generally are expressed as levels of specific air pollutants that are deemed acceptable in ambient air, and are most often designed to reduce or eliminate the human health effects of air pollution, although secondary effects such as crop and building damage may also be considered. Determining appropriate air quality standards generally requires up-to-date scientific data on the health effects of the pollutant under review, with specific information on exposure times and sensitive populations. It also generally requires periodic or continuous monitoring of air quality.

As an example, the United States Environmental Protection Agency has developed the National Ambient Air Quality Standards (NAAQS) NAAQS set attainment thresholds for sulfur dioxide, particulate matter (PM_{10} and PM_{2.5}), carbon monoxide, ozone, nitrogen oxides NO_{x}, and lead (Pb) in outdoor air throughout the United States. Another set of standards, for indoor air in employment settings, is administered by the U.S. Occupational Safety and Health Administration.

A distinction may be made between mandatory and aspirational air quality standards. For example, U.S. state governments must work toward achieving NAAQS, but are not forced to meet them. On the other hand, employers may be required immediately to rectify any violation of OSHA workplace air quality standards.

== Emission standards ==
Emission standards are the legal requirements governing air pollutants released into the atmosphere. Emission standards set quantitative limits on the permissible amount of specific air pollutants that may be released from specific sources over specific timeframes. They are generally designed to achieve air quality standards and to protect human life. Different regions and countries have different standards for vehicle emissions.

Numerous methods exist for determining appropriate emissions standards, and different regulatory approaches may be taken depending on the source, industry, and air pollutant under review. Specific limits may be set by reference to and within the confines of more general air quality standards. Specific sources may be regulated by means of performance standards, meaning numerical limits on the emission of a specific pollutant from that source category. Regulators may also mandate the adoption and use of specific control technologies, often with reference to feasibility, availability, and cost. Still other standards may be set using performance as a benchmark – for example, requiring all of a specific type of facility to meet the emissions limits achieved by the best performing facility of the group. All of these methods may be modified by incorporating emissions averaging, market mechanisms such as emissions trading, and other alternatives.

For example, all of these approaches are used in the United States. The United States Environmental Protection Agency (responsible for air quality regulation at a national level under the U.S. Clean Air Act, utilizes performance standards under the New Source Performance Standard (NSPS) program. Technology requirements are set under RACT (Reasonably Available Control Technology), BACT (Best Available Control Technology), and LAER (Lowest Achievable Emission Rate) standards. Flexibility alternatives are implemented in U.S. programs to eliminate acid rain, protect the ozone layer, achieve permitting standards, and reduce greenhouse gas emissions.

== Control technology requirements ==
In place of or in combination with air quality standards and emission control standards, governments may choose to reduce air pollution by requiring regulated parties to adopt emissions control technologies (i.e., technology that reduces or eliminates emissions). Such devices include but are not limited to flare stacks, incinerators, catalytic combustion reactors, selective catalytic reduction reactors, electrostatic precipitators, baghouses, wet scrubbers, cyclones, thermal oxidizers, Venturi scrubbers, carbon adsorbers, and biofilters.

The selection of emissions control technology may be the subject of complex regulation that may balance multiple conflicting considerations and interests, including economic cost, availability, feasibility, and effectiveness. The various weight given to each factor may ultimately determine the technology selected. The outcome of an analysis seeking a technology that all players in an industry can afford could be different from an analysis seeking to require all players to adopt the most effective technology yet developed, regardless of cost. For example, the United States Clean Air Act contains several control technology requirements, including Best Available Control Technology (BACT) (used in New Source Review), Reasonably Available Control Technology (RACT) (existing sources), Lowest Achievable Emissions Rate (LAER) (used for major new sources in non-attainment areas), and Maximum Achievable Control Technology (MACT) standards.

== Bans ==
Air quality laws may take the form of bans. While arguably a class of emissions control law (where the emission limit is set to zero), bans differ in that they may regulate activity other than the emission of a pollutant itself, even though the ultimate goal is to eliminate the emission of the pollutant.

A common example is a burn ban. Residential and commercial burning of wood materials may be restricted during times of poor air quality, eliminating the immediate emission of particulate matter and requiring use of non-polluting heating methods. A more significant example is the widespread ban on the manufacture of dichlorodifluoromethane (Freon)), formerly the standard refrigerant in automobile air conditioning systems. This substance, often released into the atmosphere unintentionally as a result of refrigerant system leaks, was determined to have a significant ozone depletion potential, and its widespread use to pose a significant threat to the Earth's ozone layer. Its manufacture was prohibited as part of a suite of restrictions adopted internationally in the Montreal Protocol to the Vienna Convention for the Protection of the Ozone Layer. Still another example is the ban on use of asbestos in building construction materials, to eliminate future exposure to carcinogenic asbestos fibers when the building materials are disturbed. Other international regulatory areas, often under the auspices of the UN or EU, have also initiated work on phasing out the use of fossil based fuel. For example, the UN's International Maritime Organization (IMO) are beginning to develop and adopt regulatory measures (MARPOL 73/78) to decarbonize international shipping.

== Data collection and access ==
Air quality laws may impose substantial requirements for collecting, storing, submitting, and providing access to technical data for various purposes, including regulatory enforcement, public health programs, and policy development.

Data collection processes may include monitoring ambient air for the presence of pollutants, directly monitoring emissions sources, or collecting other quantitative information from which air quality information may be deduced. For example, local agencies may employ a particulate matter sampler to determine ambient air quality in a locality over time. Fossil power plants may required to monitor emissions at a flue-gas stack to determine quantities of relevant pollutants emitted. Automobile manufacturers may be required to collect data regarding car sales, which, when combined with technical specifications regarding fuel consumption and efficiency, may be used to estimate total vehicle emissions. In each case, data collection may be short- or long-term, and at varying frequency (e.g., hourly, daily).

Air quality laws may include detailed requirements for recording, storing, and submitting relevant information, generally with the ultimate goal of standardizing data practices in order to facilitate data access and manipulation at a later time. Precise requirements may be very difficult to determine without technical training and may change over time in response to, for example, changes in law, changes in policy, changes in available technology, and changes in industry practice. Such requirements may be developed at a national level and reflect consensus or compromise between government agencies, regulated industry, and public interest groups.

Once air quality data are collected and submitted, some air quality laws may require government agencies or private parties to provide the public with access to the information – whether the raw data alone, or via tools to make the data more useful, accessible, and understandable. Where public access mandates are general, it may be left to the collecting agency to decide whether and to what extent the data is to be centralized and organized. For example, the United States Environmental Protection Agency, National Oceanic and Atmospheric Administration, National Park Service, and tribal, state, and local agencies coordinate to produce an online mapping and data access tool called AirNow, which provides real-time public access to U.S. air quality index information, searchable by location.

Once data are collected and published, they may be used as inputs in mathematical models and forecasts. For example, atmospheric dispersion modeling may be employed to examine the potential impact of new regulatory requirements on existing populations or geographic areas. Such models in turn could drive changes in data collection and reporting requirements.

== Controversy ==
Proponents of air quality law argue that they have caused or contributed to major reductions in air pollution, with concomitant human health and environmental benefits, even in the face of large-scale economic growth and increases in motor vehicle use. On the other hand, controversy may arise over the estimated cost of additional regulatory standards.

Arguments over cost, however, cut both ways. For example, the "estimates that the benefits of reducing fine particle and ground level ozone pollution under the 1990 Clean Air Act amendments will reach approximately $2 trillion in 2020 while saving 230,000 people from early death in that year alone." According to the same report, 2010 alone the reduction of ozone and particulate matter in the atmosphere prevented more than 160,000 cases of premature mortality, 130,000 heart attacks, 13 million lost work days and 1.7 million asthma attacks. Criticisms of EPA's methodologies in reaching these and similar numbers are publicly available.

== Around the world ==
=== International law ===
International law includes agreements related to trans-national air quality, including greenhouse gas emissions:

- Convention on Long-Range Transboundary Air Pollution (LRTAP), Geneva, 1979
- Environmental Protection: Aircraft Engine Emissions, Annex 16, vol. 2 to the Chicago Convention on International Civil Aviation, Montreal, 1981
- Framework Convention on Climate Change (UNFCCC), New York, 1992, including the Kyoto Protocol, 1997, and the Paris Agreement, 2015
- Georgia Basin-Puget Sound International Airshed Strategy, Vancouver, Statement of Intent, 2002
- U.S.-Canada Air Quality Agreement (bilateral U.S.-Canadian agreement on acid rain), 1986
- Vienna Convention for the Protection of the Ozone Layer, Vienna, 1985, including the Montreal Protocol on Substances that Deplete the Ozone Layer, Montreal, 1987

=== Canada ===
With some industry-specific exceptions, Canadian air pollution regulation was traditionally handled at the provincial level. However, under the authority of the Canadian Environmental Protection Act, 1999, the country has recently enacted a national program called the Canadian Air Quality Management System (AQMS). The program includes five main regulatory mechanisms: the Canadian Ambient Air Quality Standards (CAAQS); Base Level Industrial Emission Requirements (BLIERs) (emissions controls and technology); management of local air quality through the management of Local Air Zones; management of regional air quality through the management of Regional Airsheds; and collaboration to reduce mobile source emissions.

The Canadian government has also made efforts to pass legislation related to the country's greenhouse gas emissions. It has passed laws related to fuel economy in passenger vehicles and light trucks, heavy-duty vehicles, renewable fuels, and the energy and transportation sectors.

=== China ===
China, with severe air pollution in mega-cities and industrial centers, particularly in the north, has adapted the Airborne Pollution Prevention and Control Action Plan which aims for a 25% reduction in air pollution by 2017 from 2012 levels. Funded by $277 billion from the central government, the action plan targets PM_{2.5} particulates which affect human health.

=== Germany ===
TA Luft is the German air quality regulation.

=== India ===
The primary legislation governing air quality in India is the Air (Prevention and Control of Pollution) Act, 1981. Additionally, the government introduced the National Clean Air Programme (NCAP) in 2019, aiming to reduce particulate matter (PM) pollution by 20-30% in at least 102 cities by 2024.

=== New Zealand ===
New Zealand passed its Clean Air Act 1972 in response to growing concerns over industrial and urban air pollution. That Act classified sources, imposed permitting requirements, and created a process for determining requisite control technology. Local authorities were authorized to regulate smaller polluters. Within the Christchurch Clean Air Zone, burn bans and other measures were effected to control smog.

The Clean Air Act 1972 was replaced by the Resource Management Act 1991. The act did not set air quality standards, but did provide for national guidance to be developed. This resulted in the promulgation of New Zealand's National Environmental Standards for Air Quality in 2004 with subsequent amendments.

=== United Kingdom ===
In response to the Great Smog of 1952, the British Parliament introduced the Clean Air Act 1956. This act legislated for zones where smokeless fuels had to be burnt and relocated power stations to rural areas. The Clean Air Act 1968 introduced the use of tall chimneys to disperse air pollution for industries burning coal, liquid or gaseous fuels.

The Clean Air Act was updated in 1993. The biggest domestic impact comes from Part III, Smoke Control Areas, which are designated by local authorities and can vary by street in large towns.

=== United States ===
The primary law regulating air quality in the United States is the U.S. Clean Air Act. The law was initially enacted as the Air Pollution Control Act of 1955. Amendments in 1967 and 1970 (the framework for today's U.S. Clean Air Act) imposed national air quality requirements, and placed administrative responsibility with the newly created Environmental Protection Agency. Major amendments followed in 1977 and 1990. State and local governments have enacted similar legislation, either implementing federal programs or filling in locally important gaps in federal programs.
