= 1962 London smog =

1962 air pollution event in London, England

- Date: 4–7 December 1962
- Location: London, England; 51.507°N 0.127°W
- Deaths: 300–700
- Injuries: unknown number of people affected by breathing difficulties, lung cancer and bronchitis

A severe smog episode affected London, England, in December 1962. It occurred ten years after the Great Smog of London, in which serious air pollution had killed as many as 12,000 people. While the 1952 smog had led to the passing of the 1956 Clean Air Act, which restricted the burning of domestic fuels in urban areas with the introduction of smokeless zones, fogs continued to be smoky in London for some years after the act as residents and operators were given time to convert from domestic fuels. The December 1962 smog is thought to have led to the deaths of up to 700 people.

== Background ==
Serious smog events had become a common occurrence in London since the second half of the 19th century, with industrialisation causing an increase in air pollution that often killed hundreds of the city's inhabitants when it amassed in great quantities during the winter months. Since the Second World War, severe smog episodes had occurred in November 1948 (causing an estimated 700 to 800 deaths), December 1952 (12,000 deaths), January 1956 (1,000 deaths), December 1957 (750 deaths) and January 1959 (over 200 deaths). The 1952 Great Smog of London had forced the government to consider new anti-pollution legislation, which eventually led to the passage of the 1956 Clean Air Act that restricted the burning of domestic fuels in urban areas with the introduction of "smokeless zones". Despite the passing of the act, residents and operators were given time to convert from the burning of domestic fuels, and so smoky fogs continued to be a problem for some time, as they were in 1956, 1957 and 1959.

== Event ==
The thick, smoky fog enveloped London between 4 and 7 December 1962. Visibility was reduced to a level that lighted objects could only be seen as far as 50 feet away, while the smog caused the cancellation of flights at Heathrow Airport as well as the closure of the airport itself. Railway services became severely limited as train drivers could not see signals. A strong smell of sulphur and coal smoke became overwhelming, and pedestrians largely wore scarfs, surgical masks, handkerchiefs, or other makeshift filtering devices across their faces. The smoke levels of the smog were about one third of those in 1952, but levels of sulphur dioxide were about the same.

The Ministry of Health provided warnings to those individuals at most risk, such as sufferers of chest and heart complaints, and instructed them to "stay indoors and rest as much as possible". Doctors were encouraged to prescribe masks for vulnerable patients or "do-it-yourself masks", such as thick cotton gauze or a scarf around the mouth and nose. The public were also told to only use coke or other smokeless fuel, not burn rubbish or light bonfires and to keep windows closed.

Driving conditions became extremely hazardous in the smog, with visibility reduced in some places to zero. The level of smoke in London's atmosphere during the event was two and a half times higher than for an average winter day of that time, and the level of sulphur dioxide was seven times higher.

== Health effects ==
The smog had the effect of causing a continual metallic taste in the mouth and irritation of the nose and eyes. Cases of bronchitis increased significantly during the smog episode, including in children. It was estimated that in the City of London alone, the air pollution led to 133 excess deaths, with Greater London as a whole seeing an estimated 300–700 deaths in total.

== Aftermath ==
In total, the smog caused an estimated 20 million pounds in damages, including in health costs. The event highlighted some of the weaknesses of the 1956 Clean Air Act, in that the act had dealt with smoke emissions but had not reduced the discharge of sulphur dioxide, and this caused increasing criticism. The act was revised in 1968 when industries burning coal, gas or other fuels were ordered to use tall chimneys. In 1974 the first Control of Air Pollution act also introduced regulations on the composition of motor fuels. Smoke Control Areas (SCA) have led to a gradual reduction in smoke pollution emitted from domestic and industrial premises in modern times. Only permitted DEFRA-UK-AIR fuels may be used in chimneys using approved appliances. Failure to adhere to the legislation leaves the user exposed to fines and other sanctions.

== See also ==
- Donora Smog of 1948
- 1966 New York City smog
- 2013 Eastern China smog
- 2024 India–Pakistan smog
- Great Smog of London
- Pea soup fog
