= Smokeless fuel =

Solid fuel without emitting smoke

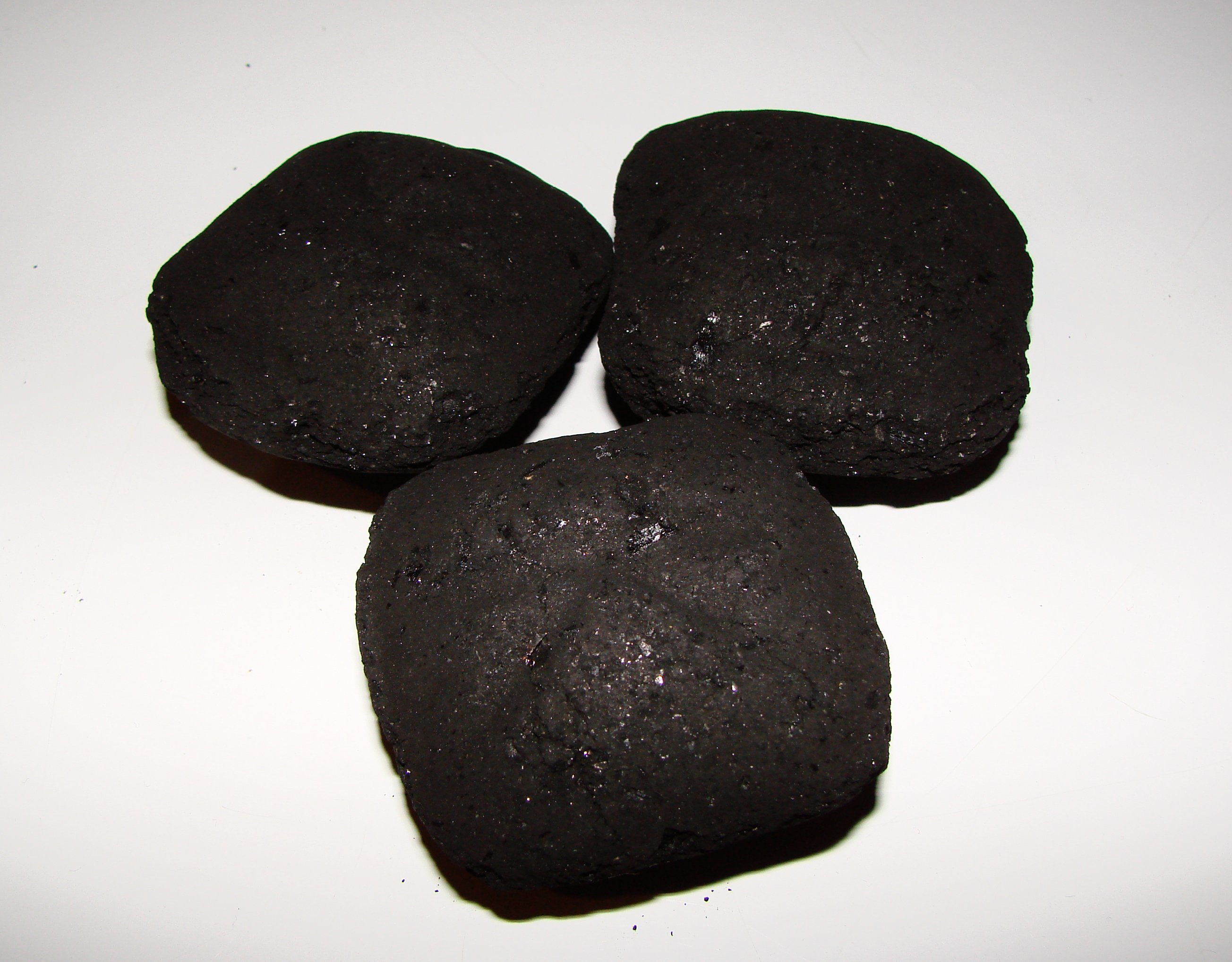
Charcoal briquettes of similar shape to coal briquettes

Smokeless fuel is a type of solid fuel which either does not emit visible smoke or emits minimal amounts during combustion. These types of fuel find use where fuels which produce smoke, such as coal and unseasoned or wet wood, are prohibited.

As a result of many places banning smoke and pollution, studies have shown that overall air quality improved, and there were fewer annual deaths related to smoke. Smokeless fuels serve as a potential replacement for fuels such as coal, which produce smoke upon combustion. Examples of smokeless fuels are anthracite, coke, charcoal and hexamine fuel tablets. Smoke-free carbonaceous fuels for domestic use are usually supplied in the form of standard pillow-shaped briquettes.

== History ==
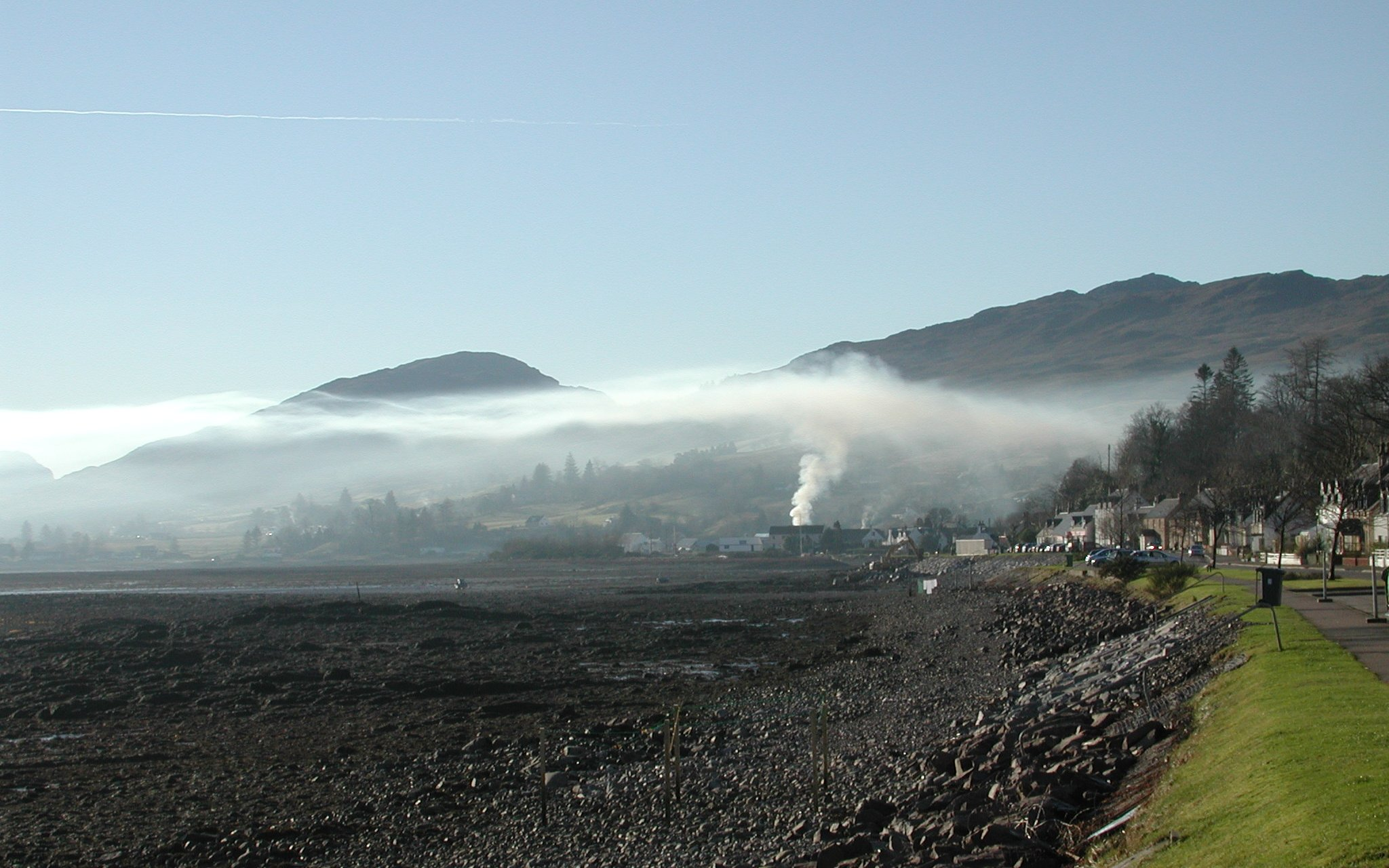
Smoke rising in Lochcarron, Scotland, is stopped by an overlying layer of warmer air (2006).

Coal was widely used for domestic cooking and heating during the Victorian period and up to the early 1950s in most urban areas in Britain. However, low-quality coal fuels and badly designed fireplaces produced pollution from smoke and tar. As a result, the smoke and noxious gases were often trapped locally when a weather inversion occurred. The trapped gases and smoke caused fogs and smogs which were a serious health hazard, and also dyed clothing and blackened the exterior of buildings. Such pea soupers—thick as pea soup, they reduced visibility to just a few metres—were generally more prevalent in the larger cities such as Manchester, Birmingham and London. Toxic gases such as sulphur dioxide (SO_{2}, produced by sulphur impurities in the coal) and nitrogen oxides were present and were a significant hazard to health. SO_{2} was especially iniquitous since it oxidises further in the air to produce highly corrosive sulphuric acid.

=== London ===
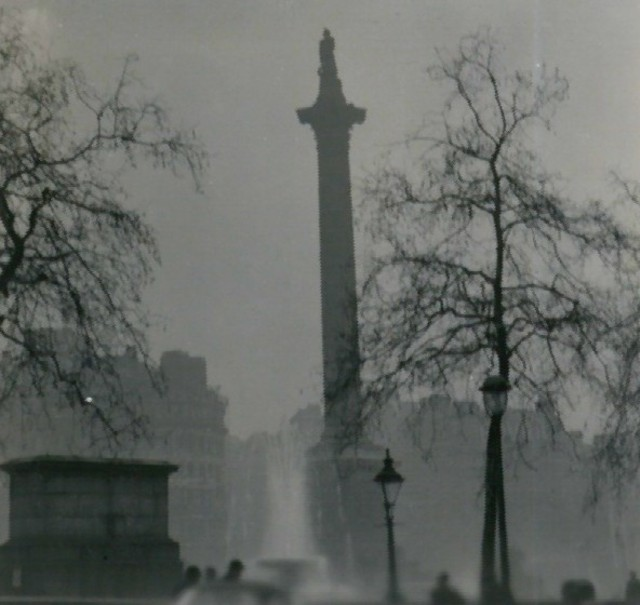
Nelson's Column during the Great Smog of 1952

In 1952, the Great Smog of London directly killed a great number of people, with estimates varying between 4,000 and 12,000 casualties, by exacerbating existing lung diseases such as bronchitis and breathing disorders such as asthma. It also killed indirectly by causing many rail, road, and pedestrian accidents due to visibility of sometimes just five yards. Clothes were stained by the soot and generally discoloured by the sulphurous gases. To protect against repetition of this tragedy, the Clean Air Act 1956 was passed. One of its consequences was the development of smokeless fuels, designed specifically to reduce the amount of noxious smoke produced, and to remove some impurities such as sulphur in the coal. Such manufactured fuels also burnt at a higher temperature, being a better and more efficient fuel for open fires as well as stoves.

== Benefits ==
Smokeless coal is more efficient than a conventional open coal fire indoors because the high working temperature is released into the room as infrared radiation, as can be judged by the bright red color of a mature fire. The hot gases produced are lost up the chimney, thereby reducing efficiency just as in an open coal fire. The gases mainly consist of carbon dioxide, carbon monoxide, and some water vapor. With little or no smoke or similar volatile compounds, chimneys remain cleaner longer and require cleaning less frequently. The main combustion reaction is:

C(s) + O_{2}(g) → CO_{2}(g)

In a restricted supply of air or oxygen toxic carbon monoxide can be formed:

2 C(s) + O_{2}(g) → 2 CO(g)

Charcoal, either unprocessed or as shaped briquettes, is widely used for outdoor barbecue grills owing to its relatively low production of smoke and the intense heat generated which cooks food relatively quickly. What little smoke is produced by wood charcoal may impart a smoky flavor to grilled food. Charcoal, tea, and raw wood are also commonly used in the manufacture of various smoked products such as smoked salmon. Charcoal is widely used in African countries for domestic cooking.

== Calorific value ==
Smokeless fuels generally have a high calorific value, with that of anthracite being greater than dry wood for example, and many smokeless briquettes are made from this type of coal. Thus anthracite has a calorific value of 32.5 MJ/kg compared with that of dry wood of about 21 MJ/kg. Lignite or brown coal is even worse with a heat of combustion of only 15 MJ/kg, owing to the presence of non-combustible impurities. Bituminous coal has a value lower than anthracite, but neither lignite nor bituminous coal are smokeless owing to their volatiles content.

== Downsides ==
Smokeless fuels also have some disadvantages. Typically they can be harder to ignite owing to the lack of volatiles present in fuels such as anthracite. There are fewer flames due to reduced volatiles, but a generally higher ash content. Fines and dust can be produced by abrasion from mechanical movement, but the amount is minimal compared with that produced by bituminous coal. It is sometimes supplied wet, even in sealed plastic bags, but is easily dried since the moisture is superficial. There is an increased cost to the user or consumer owing to the costs of mass manufacture, although the loss of volatile chemicals such as coal tar can offset those costs to the manufacturer. Those extra costs make the fuel more expensive than coal, but the effect is small at about a 30% premium over coal at 2020 prices.

Since all solid fuels are bulky and heavy, in the home they need to be carried to the fireplace, and stored in a convenient place near the house, typically in a coal bunker.

== See also ==
- Briquette
- Clean Air Act of 1963 § 1990 amendments
- Clean Air Act 1956
- Coke (fuel), a smokeless fuel made by carbonizing coal
- Energy density
