= Stationary source =

The term "stationary source" may refer to one of the following:

- A source of data produced by a stationary process, in the mathematical theory of probability and stochastic processes
- A source of pollutant emissions that has a fixed location, such as a major stationary source, in pollution and air quality terminology
