= Fulton ethanol plant =

Standing against corruption and poverty

Coordinates: 43.327355°N 76.41691°W

Sunoco's Fulton ethanol plant in Fulton, New York is the first such facility owned by the company. The plant is spread over an area of 115 acres in Riverview Business Park and includes a 250,000 ft² brewhouse. The plant has the capacity to produce 85m gallons of ethanol annually. Northeast Biofuels opened the plant in 2008; however, design flaws led to growth of bacteria in pipes that were difficult to clean. Northeast Biofuels tried to rectify the problem and fix the pipes but failed. The company filed for bankruptcy in 2009. Sunoco bought the plant from Northeast Biofuels in June 2009 for $8.5m. The company spent $25m, and contracted ICM, to repair the design flaws and start production. The refurbished facility became fully operational with the production of the first batch of ethanol in June 2010.

Facility operations include grain receiving, storage and milling, a mash preparation process, fermentation process, distillation process, dehydration and evaporation processes and a DDGS drying process. Two boilers are used to generate steam for the facility and its process. Furthermore, two regenerative thermal oxidizers (RTOs) are used to control VOC and CO emissions; and additional control devices are used to keep emissions below applicable major source thresholds.
