= Title 40 of the Code of Federal Regulations =

Part of the United States Code of Federal Regulations

Title 40 is a part of the United States Code of Federal Regulations. Title 40 arranges mainly environmental regulations that were promulgated by the US Environmental Protection Agency (EPA), based on the provisions of United States laws (statutes of the U.S. Federal Code). Parts of the regulation may be updated annually on July 1.

== Chapter I - Environmental Protection Agency ==
- Subchapter A - General (Parts 1 - 29)
- Subchapter B - Grants and Other Federal Assistance (Parts 30 - 49)
- Subchapter C - Air Programs (Parts 50 - 97) (Clean Air Act)
  - National Ambient Air Quality Standards (NAAQS)
    - Criteria air contaminants
  - Requirements for Preparation, Adoption and Submittal of Implementation Plans
  - Approval and Promulgation of Implementation Plans
  - Ambient Air Monitoring Reference and Equivalent Methods
  - Prior Notice of Citizen Suits
  - Outer Continental Shelf Air Regulations
  - Regional Consistency
  - Primary Nonferrous Smelter Orders
  - Ambient Air Quality Surveillance
  - National Volatile Organic Compound Emission Standards for Consumer and Commercial Products
  - Standards of Performance for New Stationary Sources (NSPS)
  - National Emissions Standards for Hazardous Air Pollutants (NESHAP)
  - Approval and Promulgation of State Plans for Designated Facilities and Pollutants
  - Compliance Assurance Monitoring
  - Consolidated Federal Air Rule
  - Assessment and Collection of Noncompliance Penalties by EPA
  - EPA Approval of State Noncompliance Penalty Program
  - Chemical Accident Prevention Provisions
  - Special Exemptions From Requirements of the Clean Air Act
  - State Operating Permit Programs
  - Federal Operating Permit Programs
  - Permits Regulation
  - Sulfur Dioxide Allowance System
  - Sulfur Dioxide Opt-Ins
  - Continuous Emission Monitoring
  - Acid Rain Nitrogen Oxides Emission Reduction Program
  - Excess Emissions
  - Appeal Procedures
  - Registration of Fuels and Fuel Additives
  - Regulation of Fuels and Fuel Additives
  - Designation Of Areas for Air Quality Planning Purposes
  - Protection of Stratospheric Ozone
  - Significant New Alternatives Policy (SNAP)
  - Control of Air Pollution From Mobile Sources
  - Control of Emissions From New and In-Use Highway Vehicles and Engines
  - Control of Air Pollution From Aircraft and Aircraft Engines
  - Clean-Fuel Vehicles
  - Control of Emissions From New and In-Use Nonroad Compression-Ignition Engines
  - Control of Emissions From Nonroad Spark-Ignition Engines at or Below 19 Kilowatts
  - Control of Emissions From Marine Spark-Ignition Engines
  - Control of Air Pollution From Locomotives and Locomotive Engines
  - Determining Conformity of Federal Actions to State or Federal Implementation Plans
  - Control of Emissions From Marine Compression-Ignition Engines
  - Mandatory Patent Licenses
  - NOx Budget Trading Program and CAIR NOx And SO2 Trading Programs for State Implementation Plans
  - Federal NOx Budget Trading Program and CAIR NOx and SO2 Trading Programs
- Subchapter D - Water Programs (Parts 100 - 149)
  - Clean Water Act
    - Public Hearings on Effluent Standards for Toxic Pollutants
    - Recognition Awards Under the Clean Water Act
    - Employee Protection Hearings
    - Criteria for State, Local and Regional Oil Removal Contingency Plans
    - Discharge of Oil
    - Oil Pollution Prevention
    - Liability Limits for Small Onshore Storage Facilities
    - Designation of Hazardous Substances
    - Determination of Reportable Quantities For Hazardous Substances
    - State Certification of Activities Requiring a Federal License or Permit
    - EPA-Administered Permit Programs: The National Pollutant Discharge Elimination System
    - State Program Requirements
    - Procedures for Decisionmaking
    - Criteria and Standards for the National Pollutant Discharge Elimination System
    - Toxic Pollutant Effluent Standards
    - Water Quality Planning and Management
    - Water Quality Standards
    - Water Quality Guidance for the Great Lakes System
    - Secondary Treatment Regulation
    - Prior Notice of Citizen Suits
    - Guidelines Establishing Test Procedures for the Analysis of Pollutants
    - Marine Sanitation Device Standard
  - Safe Drinking Water Act
    - National Primary Drinking Water Regulations
    - National Primary Drinking Water Regulations Implementation
    - National Secondary Drinking Water Regulations
    - Underground Injection Control (UIC) Program
    - State UIC Program Requirements
    - Underground Injection Control Program: Criteria and Standards
    - State Underground Injection Control Programs
    - Hazardous Waste Injection Restrictions
    - Sole Source Aquifers
    - Standards on the Maximum Contaminant Level of drinking water (microorganisms, viruses, turbidity, inorganic chemicals, organic chemicals, disinfectants and disinfection byproducts, radionuclides )
- Subchapter E - Pesticide Programs (Parts 150 - 180)
  - Worker protection standards and enforcement by the Occupational Safety and Health Administration
  - Tolerances and exemptions from tolerances for pesticide chemicals in food
  - Pesticide Registration and Classification Procedures
    - Pesticides classified for restricted use
  - Standards for certification of commercial and private applicators
- Subchapter F - Radiation Protection Programs (Parts 190 - 197)
  - Environmental radiation protection standards for nuclear power operations
  - Management and disposal of spent nuclear fuel, high-level and transuranic radioactive wastes
  - Protection standards for uranium and thorium mill tailings
  - Radon programs
- Subchapter G - Noise Abatement Programs (Parts 201 - 211)
  - Noise emission standards for transportation equipment
  - Product noise labeling
- Subchapter H - Ocean Dumping (Parts 220 - 238) based on the Ocean Dumping Ban Act
  - ocean dumping, dredge and fill permit application process
- Subchapter I - Solid Wastes (Parts 239 - 282) based on the Resource Conservation and Recovery Act (RCRA)
  - Guidelines for the thermal processing (incineration) of solid wastes
  - Guidelines for the storage and collection of residential, commercial, and institutional solid waste
  - Criteria for classification of solid waste disposal facilities and practices
  - Criteria for municipal solid waste landfills
  - Identification and listing of hazardous waste
  - Technical standards and corrective action requirements for owners and operators of underground storage tanks (UST)
- Subchapter J - Superfund (Parts 300 - 374) based on the Emergency Planning and Community Right-to-Know Act (EPCRA)
  - Hazardous substances designation, reportable quantities, and notification
  - Hazardous chemical reporting: Community right-to-know
  - Toxic chemical release reporting: Community right-to-know
- Subchapter N - Effluent Guidelines and Standards (Parts 400 - 471) (Clean Water Act)
  - General pretreatment regulations for existing and new sources of pollution
  - Point source categories:
    - Dairy products processing
    - Grain mills
    - Canned and preserved fruits and vegetables processing
    - Canned and preserved seafood processing
    - Sugar processing
    - Textile mills
    - Cement manufacturing
    - Concentrated animal feeding operations (CAFO)
    - Electroplating
    - Organic chemicals, plastics, and synthetic fibers (OCPSF)
    - Inorganic chemicals manufacturing
    - Soap and detergent manufacturing
    - Fertilizer manufacturing
    - Petroleum refining
    - Iron and steel manufacturing
    - Nonferrous metals manufacturing (smelters)
    - Phosphate manufacturing
    - Steam electric power generating
    - Ferroalloy manufacturing
    - Leather tanning and finishing
    - Glass manufacturing
    - Asbestos manufacturing
    - Rubber manufacturing
    - Timber products processing
    - Pulp, paper, and paperboard
    - Meat and poultry products
    - Metal finishing
    - Coal mining
    - Oil and gas extraction
    - Minerals mining and processing
    - Centralized waste treatment
    - Metal products and machinery
    - Pharmaceutical manufacturing
    - Ore mining and dressing (Hard rock mining)
    - Dental offices
    - Transportation equipment cleaning
    - Paving and roofing materials (Tars and asphalt)
    - Waste combustors
    - Landfills
    - Paint formulating
    - Ink formulating
    - Airport deicing
    - Construction and development
    - Concentrated aquatic animal production (Aquaculture)
    - Gum and wood chemicals manufacturing
    - Pesticide chemicals
    - Explosives manufacturing
    - Carbon black manufacturing
    - Photographic processing
    - Hospitals
    - Battery manufacturing
    - Plastics molding and forming
    - Metal molding and Casting (Foundries)
    - Coil coating
    - Porcelain enameling
    - Aluminum forming
    - Copper forming
    - Electrical and electronic components
    - Nonferrous metals forming and metal powders
- Subchapter O - Sewage Sludge (Parts 501 - 503) (Clean Water Act)
- Subchapter Q - Energy Policy (Parts 600 - 610)
- Subchapter R - Toxic Substances Control Act (TSCA) (Parts 700 - 799)
- Subchapter U - Air Pollution Controls (Parts 1039 - 1068)
  - Clean Air Act (1970)
  - Clean Air Act (1990)

== Chapter IV - Environmental Protection Agency and Department of Justice ==
(Part 1400)

== Chapter V - Council on Environmental Quality ==
- National Environmental Policy Act implementing regulations (Parts 1500 to 1509)

(Parts 1510 - 1518)

== Chapter VI -- Chemical Safety and Hazard Investigation Board ==
(Parts 1600-1620)

== Chapter VII -- Environmental Protection Agency and Department of Defense; Uniform National Discharge Standards for Vessels of the Armed Forces ==
(Part 1700)
