= Peter Brimblecombe =

British atmospheric chemist (born 1949)

- Born: 1949 (age 76–77); Canberra, Australia
- Education: University of Auckland
- Known for: Air pollution; Environmental history
- Awards: Società Chimica Italiana Gold Medal; 2005
- Scientific career
- Fields: Atmospheric Chemistry
- Workplaces: University of East Anglia; City University of Hong Kong; National Sun Yat-sen University
- Thesis: The Aqueous Oxidation of Atmospheric Sulphur Dioxide (1973)
- Doctoral advisor: David John Spedding
- Website: Official website

Peter Brimblecombe (born 1949) is an Australian-born, British atmospheric chemist, currently emeritus professor of atmospheric chemistry at the University of East Anglia and National Sun Yat-sen University in Taiwan. In a five-decade research career, he has written or co-authored seven books and around 400 peer-reviewed papers on air pollution and its effects on human health and the environment, but is probably best known as the author of The Big Smoke, which has been described as a definitive history of air pollution.

== Education and career ==
Brimblecombe was born in Canberra, Australia and educated at the University of Auckland, New Zealand, where he earned a BSc (1970), MSc (1971), and PhD in chemistry (1973). His thesis, studying the aqueous chemistry of environmental sulfur dioxide, was supervised by David John Spedding. Following his doctorate, he worked in Fiji for a year, lecturing in inorganic chemistry at the School of Natural Resources of the University of the South Pacific. In 1974, he relocated to Britain to become first a lecturer then a professor in atmospheric chemistry at the University of East Anglia (UEA), where he also served as associate dean from 2008 to 2011. Following his retirement, after four decades at UEA, he moved to Hong Kong and shifted the focus of his research to study air pollution in Asia. From 2013 to 2018, he was chair professor of environmental chemistry at the School of Energy and Environment, City University of Hong Kong, then became Distinguished Research Chair Professor at National Sun Yat-sen University in Taiwan. He is currently emeritus professor of atmospheric chemistry at the University of East Anglia and at National Sun Yat-sen University.

== Research interests ==
Brimblecombe's wide-ranging research has covered many different aspects of atmospheric chemistry and air pollution, but also makes connections to broader history, art, and culture. As he put it in a 2009 lecture: "Environmental pollution is not merely a matter of environmental chemistry. The smells have to be smelt. Painting and poetry can be as informative as a scientific description when trying to understand the complexities of environmental problems".

His 1987 book The Big Smoke: A History of Air Pollution in London since Medieval Times is highly cited and often described as a "definitive", "classic" history of air pollution, although historians' views of the book were mixed.

He has published numerous papers on the effects of air pollution on historic buildings and monuments, and both historical artifacts and everyday objects. In 2004, he was one of a group of experts from 10 countries involved in a three-year "Noah's Ark" project designed "to investigate the effects of climate change and pollution on Europe's historic built environment over the next 100 years". He has provided scientific advice on heritage and conservation to the Council of Europe, the European Parliament and the House of Lords.

In the late 1990s, while working at UEA, Brimblecombe advised the National Trust on strategies to minimize the impact of dust on its historic collections, which led the organization to "ban" dusting for a three years and prompted considerable news comment. Giles Whittell, writing in The Times, noted that Brimblecombe, "who may know more about dust than anyone in the world, has advised historic houses to guide their visitors along routes with as few sharp turns as possible and to position their most precious artefacts at the end of the tour, by which time fatigue has set in and people fidget less". In the same paper, Simon Jenkins described Brimblecombe as "the nation's mite-buster king-at-arms, who strikes terror in the sternest housekeeper" and expressed mixed views about the plan.

Brimblecombe's recent research includes studies of how microplastics are carried through the environment, how COVID-19 affected air pollution, and how pollution is depicted in the work of artists and writers such as Monet and Dickens.

== Other activities ==
Brimblecombe served as chief editor of the academic journal Atmospheric Environment and is currently editor in chief of the journal City and Environment Interactions. He sits on the editorial boards of the Journal of Cultural Heritage and Environmental Chemistry.

He is a frequent media commentator on issues related to pollution and the environment, including such topics as the ozone layer, climate change, air pollution in China, atmospheric acidity and acid rain, and the 1952 Great Smog of London.

== Awards ==
Brimblecombe has been awarded the 2005 Società Chimica Italiana Gold Medal for his environmental research and, as part of the Noah's Ark project, mapping the impacts of climate change on heritage, the 2009 European Union Prize for Cultural Heritage / Europa Nostra Awards Grand Prize, which recognizes excellence in heritage conservation.

== Selected publications ==
=== Books ===
- Brimblecombe, Peter (1987). The Big Smoke (Routledge Revivals): A History of Air Pollution in London since Medieval Times. Routledge. ISBN 978-1-136-70329-4.
- — (1996). Air Composition and Chemistry. Cambridge University Press. ISBN 978-0-521-45972-3.
- — (2003). The Effects Of Air Pollution On The Built Environment. World Scientific. ISBN 978-1-78326-136-9.
- — (2015). Urban Pollution And Changes To Materials And Building Surfaces. World Scientific. ISBN 978-1-78326-887-0.

=== Articles ===
- Clegg, Simon L.; Brimblecombe, Peter; Wexler, Anthony S. (26 February 1998). "Thermodynamic Model of the System H^{+}−NH_{4}^{+}−SO_{4}^{2−}−NO_{3}^{−}−H_{2}O at Tropospheric Temperatures". The Journal of Physical Chemistry A. 102 (12): 2137–2154. Bibcode:1998JPCA..102.2137C. doi:10.1021/jp973042r. eISSN 1520-5215. ISSN 1089-5639.
- Grossi, Carlota M.; Brimblecombe, Peter (9 June 2004). "Aesthetics of Simulated Soiling Patterns on Architecture". Environmental Science & Technology. 38 (14): 3971–3976. Bibcode:2004EnST...38.3971G. doi:10.1021/es0353762. eISSN 1520-5851. ISSN 0013-936X. PMID 15298208.
- Brimblecombe, Peter; Grossi, Carlota M. (October 2005). "Aesthetic thresholds and blackening of stone buildings". Science of the Total Environment. 349 (1–3): 175–189. Bibcode:2005ScTEn.349..175B. doi:10.1016/j.scitotenv.2005.01.009. ISSN 0048-9697. PMID 16198679.
- Brimblecombe, Peter (December 2005). "The globalization of local air pollution". Globalizations. 2 (3): 429–441. Bibcode:2005Glob....2..429B. doi:10.1080/14747730500368114. eISSN 1474-774X. ISSN 1474-7731. S2CID 144558970.
- Brimblecombe, Peter (1 November 2006). "The Clean Air Act after 50 years". Weather. 61 (11): 311–314. Bibcode:2006Wthr...61..311B. doi:10.1256/wea.127.06. eISSN 1477-8696. ISSN 0043-1656. S2CID 123552841.
- Wang, Tao; Xue, Likun; Brimblecombe, Peter; Lam, Yun Fat; Li, Li; Zhang, Li (January 2017). "Ozone pollution in China: A review of concentrations, meteorological influences, chemical precursors, and effects". Science of the Total Environment. 575: 1582–1596. Bibcode:2017ScTEn.575.1582W. doi:10.1016/j.scitotenv.2016.10.081. hdl:10397/65760. ISSN 0048-9697. PMID 27789078.
- Fowler, David; Brimblecombe, Peter; Burrows, John; Heal, Mathew; Grennfelt, Peringe; et al. (30 October 2020). "A chronology of global air quality". Phil. Trans. R. Soc. A. 378 (2183). Bibcode:2020RSPTA.37890314F. doi:10.1098/rsta.2019.0314. PMC 7536029. PMID 32981430.
