= State Implementation Plan =

A State Implementation Plan (SIP) is a United States state plan for complying with the federal Clean Air Act, administered by the Environmental Protection Agency (EPA). The SIP, developed by a state agency and approved by EPA, consists of narrative, rules, technical documentation, and agreements that an individual state will use to control and clean up polluted areas.

== Lowest achievable emissions rate ==
The Lowest achievable emissions rate (LAER) is used by the EPA to determine if emissions from a new or modified major stationary source are acceptable under SIP guidelines. LAER standards are required when a new stationary source is located in a non-attainment air-quality region. It is the most stringent air pollution standard above the best available control technology and reasonably available control technology standards.

== Best available control technology ==
Best available control technology (BACT) is a pollution control standard mandated by the Clean Air Act:

..an emission limitation based on the maximum degree of reduction of each pollutant subject to regulation under this Act emitted from or which results from any major emitting facility, which the permitting authority, on a case-by-case basis, taking into account energy, environmental, and economic impacts and other costs, determines is achievable for such facility through application of production processes and available methods, systems, and techniques, including fuel cleaning, clean fuels, or treatment or innovative fuel combustion techniques for control of each such pollutant.

The EPA determines what air pollution control technology will be used to control a specific pollutant to a specified limit. When a BACT is determined, factors such as energy consumption, total source emission, regional environmental impact, and economic costs are taken into account. It is the current EPA standard for all polluting sources that fall under the New Source Review guidelines and is determined on a case-by-case basis.

The BACT standard is significantly more stringent than the reasonably available control technology standard but much less stringent than the lowest achievable emissions rate standard.

== Reasonably available control technology ==
Reasonably available control technology (RACT) is a pollution control standard created by the EPA and is used to determine what air pollution control technology will be used to control a specific pollutant to a specified limit. RACT applies to existing sources in areas that are not meeting national ambient air quality standards on controlled air pollutants and is required on all sources that meet these criteria.

The RACT standard is less stringent than either the BACT or the LAER standard set forth by the EPA.

== Example: Ohio State Implementation Plan ==
In Ohio, between 1970 and 1977, a rule in the Clean Air Act required a reduction in the measured sulfur dioxide (SO_{2}) emitted by coal-fired power plants. The State Implementation Plan to decrease the SO_{2} emitted by such plants was to increase the height of the smokestacks on the plants. The result was that the SO_{2} was carried in the wind out of the state and there was a reduction in the measured SO_{2} in the area near the source. In the 1977 amendments to the Act, Congress restricted the use of tall smokestacks as a means to attain compliance in SIPs.

== See also ==
- Appropriate technology
- National Emissions Standards for Hazardous Air Pollutants (NESHAP)
- New Source Performance Standard
