= Hazardous waste in the United States =

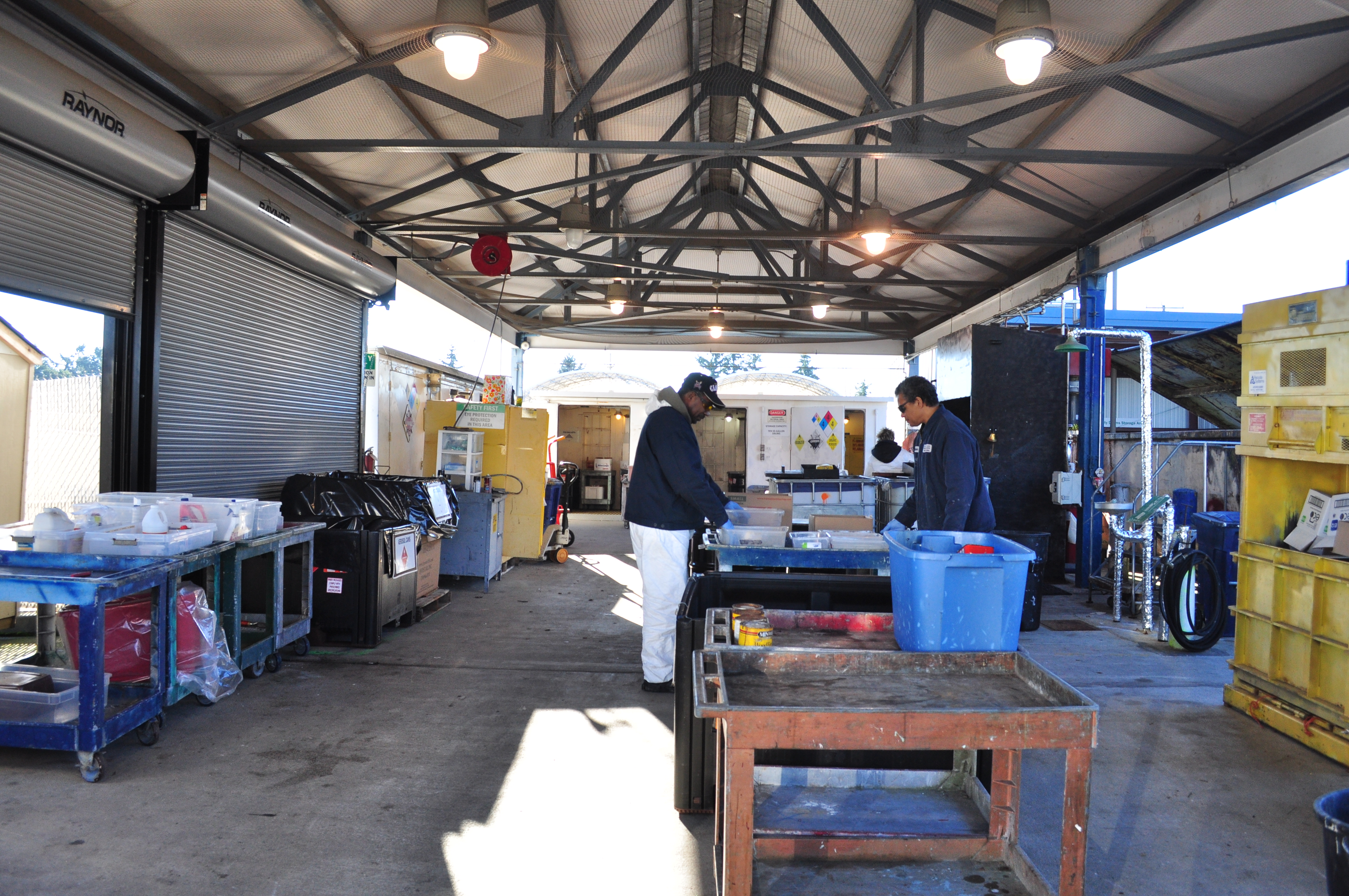
A household hazardous waste collection center in Seattle, Washington, U.S.

Under United States environmental policy, hazardous waste is a waste (usually a solid waste) that has the potential to:

- cause, or significantly contribute to an increase in mortality or an increase in serious irreversible, or incapacitating reversible illness; or
- pose a substantial present or potential hazard to human health or the environment when improperly treated, stored, transported, or disposed of, or otherwise managed.

Under the 1976 Resource Conservation and Recovery Act (RCRA), a facility that treats, stores or disposes of hazardous waste must obtain a permit for doing so. Generators of and transporters of hazardous waste must meet specific requirements for handling, managing, and tracking waste. Through RCRA, Congress directed EPA to issue regulations for the management of hazardous waste. EPA developed strict requirements for all aspects of hazardous waste management including the treatment, storage, and disposal of hazardous waste. In addition to these federal requirements, states may develop more stringent requirements or requirements that are broader in scope than the federal regulations.

EPA authorizes states to implement the RCRA hazardous waste program. Authorized states must maintain standards that are equivalent to and at least as stringent as the federal program. Implementation of the authorized program usually includes activities such as permitting, corrective action, inspections, monitoring and enforcement.

== Regulatory history ==
=== Resource Conservation and Recovery Act ===
Modern hazardous waste regulations in the U.S. began with RCRA, which was enacted in 1976. The primary contribution of RCRA was to create a "cradle to grave" system of record keeping for hazardous wastes. Hazardous wastes must be tracked from the time they are generated until their final disposition.

RCRA's recordkeeping system helps to track the life cycle of hazardous material and reduces the amount of hazardous waste illegally disposed. Regulators can monitor hazardous waste by following the "trail" of the waste as is transferred from one entity to another, from the time it is generated until it is disposed.

Amendments to RCRA specified requirements for incinerators and small quantity generators of hazardous waste and required substandard landfills to be closed. Congress also exempted coal combustion residuals and mining waste from the strict hazardous waste permitting requirements.

=== Comprehensive Environmental Response, Compensation, and Liability Act ===
The Comprehensive Environmental Response, Compensation, and Liability Act (CERCLA), was enacted in 1980. The primary contribution of CERCLA was to create a financial "Superfund" and provide for the clean-up and remediation of closed and abandoned hazardous waste sites.

=== International treaties ===
The United States is not a party to the Basel Convention, a 1992 treaty which prohibits the export of hazardous waste from developed countries to developing countries. Research by the Guardian and Quinto Elemento Lab shows that US companies ship more than a million tons of hazardous waste to other countries each year.

== Types of hazardous waste ==
=== Characteristic wastes ===
Under EPA regulations, "characteristic hazardous wastes" are defined as wastes that exhibit the following characteristics: ignitability, corrosivity, reactivity, or toxicity.

==== Ignitability ====
Ignitable wastes can create fires under certain conditions, are spontaneously combustible, or are liquids with a flash point less than 60 °C (140 °F). Examples include waste oils and used solvents. They are defined by 40 CFR §261.21. Test methods that may be used to determine ignitability include the Pensky-Martens Closed-Cup Method for Determining Ignitability, the Setaflash Closed-Cup Method for Determining Ignitability, and the Ignitability of Solids.

==== Corrosive ====
Corrosive wastes are acids or bases (pH less than or equal to 2, or greater than or equal to 12.5) that are capable of corroding metal containers, such as storage tanks, drums, and barrels. Battery acid is an example. They are defined by 40 CFR §261.22. The test method that may be used to determine corrosivity is the Corrosivity Towards Steel (Method 1110A).

==== Reactivity ====
Reactive wastes are unstable under "normal" conditions. They can cause explosions, toxic fumes, radioactive particles, gases, or vapors when heated, compressed, or mixed with water. Examples include lithium-sulfur batteries and explosives. They are defined by 40 CFR §261.23. There are currently no test methods available.

==== Toxicity ====
Toxic wastes are those containing concentrations of certain substances in excess of regulatory thresholds which are expected to cause injury or illness to human health or the environment. They are defined by 40 CFR §261.24. Toxicity of a hazardous waste is defined through a laboratory procedure called the toxicity characteristic leaching procedure (TCLP). The TCLP helps identify wastes likely to leach concentrations of contaminants into the environment that may be harmful to human health or the environment.

=== Listed wastes ===
Listed hazardous wastes are generated by specific industries and processes and are automatically considered hazardous waste based solely on the process that generates them and irrespective of whether a test of the waste shows any of the "characteristics" of hazardous waste. Examples of listed wastes include:

- many sludges left over from electroplating processes.
- certain waste from iron and steel manufacturing
- wastes from certain cleaning and/or degreasing processes

Hazardous wastes are incorporated into lists published by the Environmental Protection Agency. These lists are organized into three categories:

- The F-list (non-specific source wastes). This list identifies wastes from common manufacturing and industrial processes, such as solvents that have been used in cleaning or degreasing operations. Because the processes producing these wastes can occur in different sectors of industry, the F-listed wastes are known as wastes from non-specific sources. (See 40 CFR 261.31)
- The K-list (source-specific wastes). This list includes certain wastes from specific industries, such as petroleum refining or pesticide manufacturing. Certain sludges and wastewaters from treatment and production processes in these industries are examples of source-specific wastes. (See 40 CFR 261.32)
- Discarded Wastes: P-List and U-List wastes are actually sublists of the same major list applying to discarded wastes. These wastes apply to commercial chemical products that are considered hazardous when discarded and are regulated under the following U.S. Federal Regulation: 40 C.F.R. 261.33 (e) and (f). P-List wastes are wastes that are considered "acutely hazardous" when discarded and are subject to more stringent regulation. Nitric oxide is an example of a P-list waste and carries the number P076. U-Listed wastes are considered "hazardous" when discarded and are regulated in a somewhat less stringent manner than P-Listed wastes. Acetone is an example of a U-Listed waste and carries the number U002.

==== Hazardous waste listed by states ====
Additionally, states may have specific waste codes. For example, the California Department of Toxic Substances Control distinguishes discarded mercury-containing products and waste oil as separate groups of hazardous waste.

===== Discarded mercury-containing products (M-List) =====
This list includes certain wastes known to contain mercury, such as fluorescent lamps, mercury switches and the products that house these switches, and mercury-containing novelties.

===== Waste oil =====
In California, waste oil and materials that contain or are contaminated with waste oil are usually regulated as hazardous wastes if they meet the definition of "Used Oil" even if they do not exhibit any of the characteristics of hazardous waste. The term "used oil" is a legal term which means any oil that has been refined from crude oil, or any synthetic oil that has been used and, as a result of use, is contaminated with physical or chemical impurities. Other materials that contain or are contaminated with used oil may also be subject to regulation as "used oil" under Part 279 of Title 40 of the Code of Federal Regulations. Standards for the Management of Used Oil

=== Universal wastes ===
Universal wastes are hazardous wastes that:

- generally pose a lower threat relative to other hazardous wastes
- are ubiquitous and produced in very large quantities by a large number of generators.

Some of the most common "universal wastes" are: fluorescent light bulbs, batteries, cathode ray tubes, and mercury-containing devices.

Universal wastes are subject to somewhat less stringent regulatory requirements and small quantity generators of universal wastes may be classified as "conditionally-exempt small quantity generators" (CESQGs) which releases them from some of the regulatory requirements for the handling and storage of hazardous wastes.

Universal wastes must still be disposed of properly.

=== Other hazardous wastes ===
EPA has other ways of regulating hazardous waste. These regulations include:

- The "Mixture Rule" (40 CFR Section 261.3(a)) applies to a mixture of a listed hazardous waste and a solid waste and states that the result of a mixture of these two wastes is regulated as a hazardous waste. Exemptions may apply in some cases.
- The "Derived-from Rule" (40 CFR Section 261.3(b)) applies to a waste that is generated from the treatment, storage or disposal of a hazardous waste (for example, the ash from the incineration of hazardous waste). Wastes "derived" in this manner may be regulated as hazardous wastes.
- The "Contained-in Rule" (40 CFR Section 261.3(f)) applies to soil, groundwater, surface water and debris that are contaminated with a listed hazardous waste.

== Exempted hazardous wastes ==
EPA regulations automatically exempt certain solid wastes from being regulated as "hazardous wastes". This does not necessarily mean the wastes are not hazardous nor that they are not regulated. An exempted hazardous waste simply means that the waste is not regulated by the primary hazardous waste regulations. Many of these wastes may be regulated by different statutes and/or regulations and/or by different regulatory agencies. For example, many hazardous mining wastes are regulated via mining statutes and regulations. "Exempted" hazardous wastes include:

- Household hazardous waste (HHW); (see below)
- Agricultural wastes which are returned to the ground as fertilizer;
- Mining overburden returned to the mine site;
- Utility wastes from coal combustion to produce electricity;
- Oil and natural gas exploration drilling waste;
- Wastes from the extraction, beneficiation and processing of ores and minerals, including coal;
- Cement kiln wastes;
- Wood treated with arsenic preservatives.
- Certain chromium-containing wastes.
- Recycled hazardous wastes: Some hazardous wastes that are recycled may also be exempted from hazardous waste regulations.

== Household hazardous waste ==
Household hazardous waste (HHW), also referred to as "domestic hazardous waste," is waste that is generated from residential households. HHW only applies to wastes that are the result of the use of materials that are labeled for and sold for "home use" and that are purchased by homeowners or tenants for use in a residential household.

The following list includes categories often applied to HHW. Many of these categories overlap and that many household wastes can fall into multiple categories:

- Paints and solvents
- Automotive wastes (used motor oil, antifreeze, old gasoline, etc.)
- Pesticides (insecticides, herbicides, fungicides, etc.)
- Mercury-containing wastes (thermometers, switches, fluorescent lighting, etc.)
- Electronics (computers, televisions, cell phones)
- Aerosols / Propane cylinders
- Caustics / Cleaning agents
- Refrigerant-containing appliances
- Batteries
- Ammunition
- Radioactive waste (some home smoke detectors are classified as radioactive waste because they contain very small amounts of a radioactive isotope of americium. See: Disposing of Smoke Detectors).

=== Disposal of HHW ===
Because of the expense associated with the disposal of HHW, it is still legal for most homeowners in the U.S. to dispose of most types of household hazardous wastes as municipal solid waste (MSW) and these wastes can be put in your trash. Laws vary by state and municipality and they are changing every day. Be sure to check with your local environmental regulatory agency, solid waste authority, or health department to find out how HHW is managed in your area.

Modern landfills are designed to handle normal amounts of HHW and minimize the environmental impacts. However, there are still going to be some impacts and there are many ways that homeowners can keep these wastes out of landfills.

Laws regulating HHW in the U.S. are gradually becoming more strict. As of 2007, radioactive smoke detectors are the only HHW that are managed nationally. While it is still legal in the United States to dispose of smoke detectors in your trash in most places, manufacturers of smoke detectors must accept returned units for disposal as mandated by the Nuclear Regulatory law 10 CFR 32.27. If you send your detector back to a manufacturer then it will be disposed in a nuclear waste facility.

States regulate HHW waste disposal in MSW landfills with various requirements, on a state-by-state basis. Some commonly regulated wastes in some (but not all) states include restrictions on the disposal of:

- Recyclables (especially "source-separated" recyclables or recyclables that have already been separated from solid waste). In this case this would only apply to household hazardous wastes that have been separated for recycling.
- Lead-acid batteries
- Mercury-containing wastes
- Rechargeable batteries
- Cathode ray tubes (CRTs) from older computer monitors and televisions
- Cell phones and computers
- Refrigerant containing appliances such as a refrigerator, air conditioner or dehumidifier.

(Note: Yard waste or "green waste" (particularly "source-separated" yard waste such as from a city leaf collection program) is not hazardous but may be a regulated household waste)

Local solid waste authorities and health departments may also have specific bans on wastes that apply to their service area.

=== Solid waste haulers and HHW ===
One "catch-22" that residents often encounter is that while it may be legal to dispose of some HHW in their regular trash, the waste hauler that collects the trash can choose not to haul the waste. It is not uncommon for a waste hauler to refuse to pick up municipal solid waste that contains things like paint and fluorescent light bulbs. There is often little recourse for residents in this case. In these cases the resident may have to make their own arrangements to dispose of the waste by taking it directly to a landfill or solid waste transfer station.

== Final disposition ("disposal") of hazardous waste ==
Hazardous wastes (HWs) are typically dealt with in five different ways:

=== Recycling ===
Many HWs can be recycled into new products.

=== Neutralization ===
Some HW can be processed so that the hazardous component of the waste is eliminated making it a non-hazardous waste.

=== Incineration, destruction and waste-to-energy ===
A HW may be "destroyed" for example by incinerating it at a high temperature.

=== Hazardous waste landfill (sequestering, isolation, etc.) ===
A HW may be sequestered in a HW landfill or permanent disposal facility. "In terms of hazardous waste, a landfill is defined as a disposal facility or part of a facility where hazardous waste is placed in or on land and which is not a pile, a land treatment facility, a surface impoundment, an underground injection well, a salt dome formation, a salt bed formation, an underground mine, a cave, or a corrective action management unit (40 CFR 260.10)."

== See also ==
- Agency for Toxic Substances and Disease Registry
- Bamako Convention
- Mixed waste (radioactive/hazardous)
- Hazardous Waste and Substances Sites List in the State of California
- List of Superfund sites in the United States
- Radioactive waste
- Environmental remediation
- Unexploded ordnance in the United States
