= Major stationary source =

A major stationary source is a source that emits more than a certain amount of a pollutant as defined by the U.S. Environmental Protection Agency (EPA). The amount of pollutants allowed for certain new sources is defined by the EPA's New Source Performance Standards (NSPRS).

A stationary source in air quality terminology is any fixed emitter of air pollutants, such as fossil fuel burning power plants, petroleum refineries, petrochemical plants, food processing plants and other heavy industrial sources.

A mobile source in air quality terminology is a non-stationary source of air pollutants, such as automobiles, buses, trucks, ships, trains, aircraft and various other vehicles.

== See also ==
- Air pollution dispersion terminology
- Atmospheric dispersion modeling
- AP 42 Compilation of Air Pollutant Emission Factors
- Lowest Achievable Emissions Rate
