= New Source Performance Standards =

Pollution control standards

New Source Performance Standards (NSPS) are pollution control standards issued by the United States Environmental Protection Agency (EPA). The term is used in the Clean Air Act Extension of 1970 (CAA) to refer to air pollution emission standards, and in the Clean Water Act (CWA) referring to standards for water pollution discharges of industrial wastewater to surface waters.

== Introduction ==
Some pollution control laws are organized with varying degrees of stringency. The different standards may be based on several factors, including whether the pollution source is an existing facility at the time the standard is published, or is constructed after publication. The standards for new sources may be more stringent than that for existing facilities, on the principle that a new plant can be designed with the latest and most advanced control technologies.

== Clean Air Act ==
The Clean Air Act NSPS dictate the level of pollution that a new stationary source may produce. These standards are authorized by Section 111 of the CAA and the regulations are published in 40 CFR Part 60. NSPS have been established for a number of individual industrial or source categories. Examples:

- Air emissions from chemical manufacturing wastewater
- Boilers
- Landfills
- Petroleum refineries
- Stationary gas turbines.

=== Basic process for establishing standards ===
1. Identify type of emitting facility.
2. For each type of facility, identify the type of pollutant control technology that is appropriate.
3. From a study of all the plants and all the information available about the plants and their technologies, establish an allowed concentration of the criteria pollutants that is the upper limit of what can be emitted.

== Clean Water Act ==
Under the Clean Water Act, NSPS set the level of allowable wastewater discharges from new industrial facilities. EPA issues NSPS for categories of industrial dischargers, typically in conjunction with the issuance of effluent guidelines for existing sources. In developing NSPS, the CWA requires that EPA determine the "best available demonstrated control technology" (BADCT) for the particular industrial category. BADCT may be more stringent than the best available technology economically achievable standard used for existing dischargers. This consideration may include setting a "no discharge of pollutants standard" (also called a "zero discharge" standard) if practicable.

NSPS regulations are published at 40 CFR Subchapter N (Parts 405-499). NSPS issued by EPA include the following categories:

- Coal Mining
- Concentrated Animal Feeding Operations (including zero discharge requirements)
- Dairy Products
- Inorganic Chemicals Manufacturing (including a zero discharge requirement for several subcategories)
- Iron and Steel Manufacturing
- Oil and Gas Extraction
- Petroleum Refining
- Pulp, Paper and Paperboard
- Sugar Processing (including a zero discharge requirement for one subcategory)
- Textile Mills.

EPA published a general definition of "new source" in its wastewater permit regulations. More specialized definitions of "new source" are included in some of the individual category regulations, e.g., the definition for the Pulp, Paper and Paperboard category.

== See also ==
- National Emissions Standards for Hazardous Air Pollutants
- New Source Review - CAA pre-construction review process for new or modified facilities
