= Pea soup fog =

Type of smog

Piccadilly Circus during the Great Smog of London, 1952

Pea soup fog (also known as a pea souper, black fog or killer fog) is a very thick and often greenish-yellow fog caused by air pollution that contains tarry soot particulates and the poisonous gas sulphur dioxide. This very thick smog occurs in cities and is derived from the smoke given off by the burning of soft coal for home heating and in industrial processes. Chronic exposure to smog of this intensity can be lethal to vulnerable people such as the elderly, infants, and those with respiratory problems. The result of these phenomena was commonly known as a London particular or London fog; in a reversal of the idiom, "London particular" became the name for a thick pea and ham soup.

== Historical observations ==
From as early as the 13th century, air pollution became increasingly prevalent, and a predominant perception in the 13th century was that sea-coal smoke would affect one's health. From the mid-17th century, in British cities, especially London, the incidence of ill-health was attributed to coal smoke from both domestic and industrial chimneys combining with the mists and fogs of the Thames Valley. Luke Howard, a pioneer in urban climate studies, published The Climate of London in 1818–1820, in which he uses the term "city fog" and describes the heat island effect which concentrated the accumulation of smog over the city.

In 1880, Francis Albert Rollo Russell, son of former prime minister John Russell, 1st Earl Russell, published a leaflet that blamed home hearth smoke, rather than factories' smoke, for damaging the city's important buildings, depriving vegetation of sunlight, and increasing the expense and effort of laundering clothes. Furthermore, he charged the "perpetually present" sulphurous smoke with increasing bronchitis and other respiratory diseases. More than 2,000 Londoners had "literally choked to death", he wrote, on account of "a want of carefulness in preventing smoke in our domestic fires" which emitted coal smoke from "more than a million chimneys" that, when combined with the prolonged fogs of late January and early February 1880, fatally aggravated pre-existing lung conditions and was "more fatal than the slaughter of many a great battle".

The difficulties of driving through the fog were vividly described in the Autocar magazine, with an otherwise straightforward 45 miles (72 km) car journey on the night of 12 December 1946 taking over eight hours to complete. At times, the passenger had to get out and walk alongside the car to see the kerb and operate the steering through the side window while the driver operated the pedals.

The most lethal incidence of this smog in London occurred in 1952 and resulted in the Clean Air Act 1956 and Clean Air Act 1968, both now repealed and consolidated into the Clean Air Act 1993, which were effective in largely removing sulphur dioxide and coal smoke, the causes of pea soup fog, though these have been replaced by less visible pollutants that derive from vehicles in urban areas.

== Origins of the term ==
Reference to the sources of smog, along with the earliest extant use of "pea-soup" as a descriptor, is found in a report by John Sartain published in 1820 on life as a young artist, recounting what it was like to

slink home through a fog as thick and as yellow as the pea-soup of the eating house; return to your painting room ... having opened your window at going out, to find the stink of the paint rendered worse, if possible, by the entrance of the fog, which, being a compound from the effusions of gas pipes, tan yards, chimneys, dyers, blanket scourers, breweries, sugar bakers, and soap boilers, may easily be imagined not to improve the smell of a painting room!

An 1871 New York Times article refers to "London, particularly, where the population are periodically submerged in a fog of the consistency of pea soup". The fogs caused large numbers of deaths from respiratory problems.

== Remediation ==
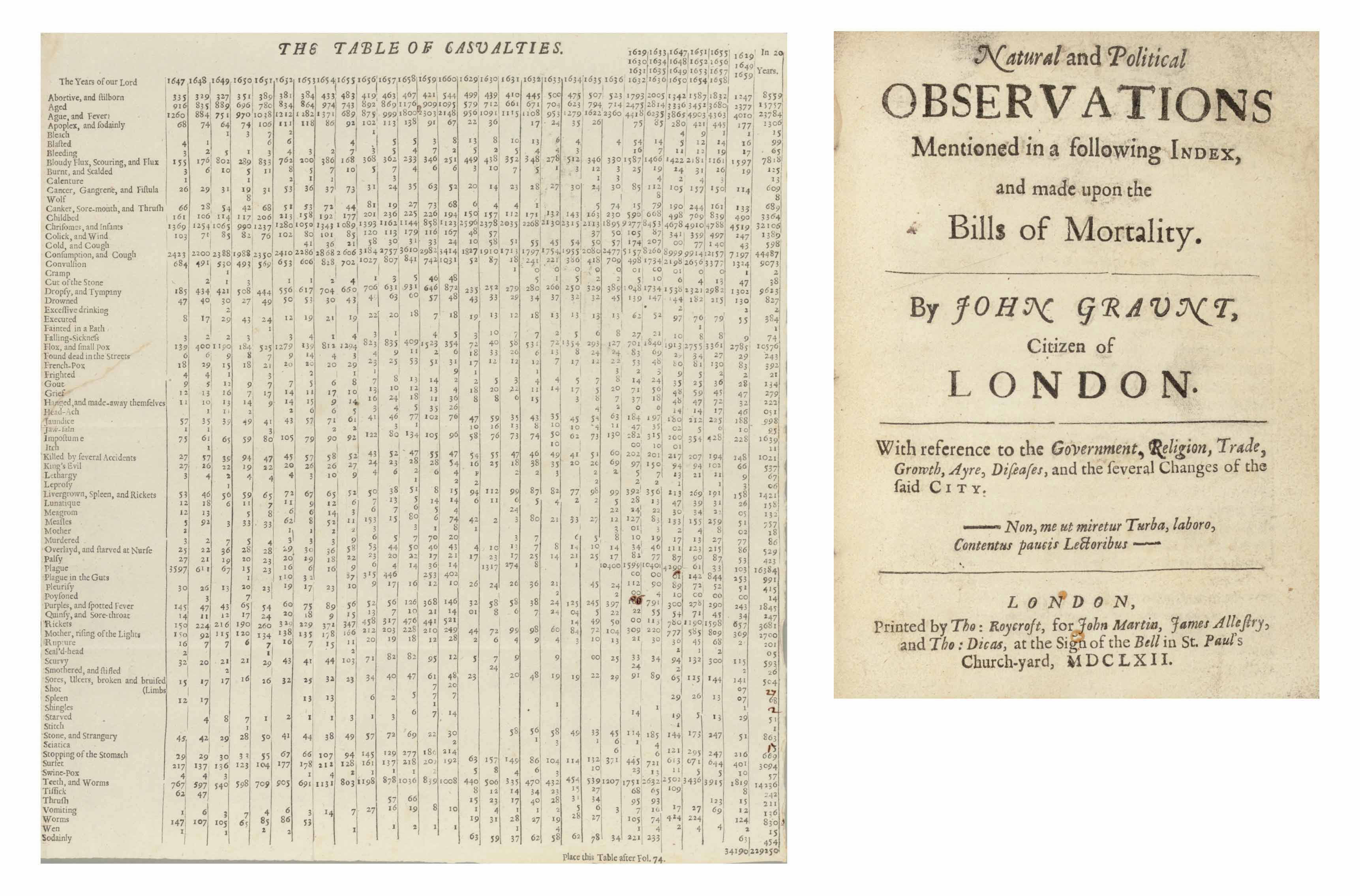
Table and title page of John Graunt's (1620–1674) Natural and political observations ... upon ... mortality (1662) which notes mortality attributed to air pollution in London

King Edward I of England banned the burning of sea-coal by proclamation in London in 1272, after its smoke became a problem. By the 17th century London's pollution had become a serious problem, still due, in particular, to the burning of cheap, readily available sea coal. John Evelyn, advisor to Charles II of England, defined the problem in his pamphlet, Fumifugium: Or, the Inconvenience of the Aer and Smoak of London Dissipated published in 1661, blaming coal, a "subterrany fuel" that had "a kind of virulent or arsenical vapour arising from it" for killing many. He proposed the relocation of industry out of the city and the planting of massive gardens of "odiferous flowers" to "tinge the air" and thus mask the pollution.

=== Clean Air Act ===
The worst recorded instance was the Great Smog of 1952, when 4,000 deaths were reported in the city over a couple of days, and a subsequent 8,000 related deaths, leading to the passage of the Clean Air Act 1956, which banned the use of coal for domestic fires in some urban areas.

== See also ==
- Great Smog of London
- Fog Investigation and Dispersal Operation (FIDO) – an aircraft landing aid intended to allow safe flying during the extremes of 'pea souper' fog
