= Fumifugium =

17th century treatise on air pollution

Fumifugium, or, The inconveniencie of the aer and smoak of London dissipated together with some remedies humbly proposed by J.E. esq. to His Sacred Majestie, and to the Parliament now assembled is a pamphlet published in London in 1661 by John Evelyn. It is one of the earliest known works on air pollution and is still considered a significant contribution to the literature on the subject over three and half centuries after its publication. The letter was specifically addressed to King Charles II of England and discussed problems with the capital's air pollution dating back to medieval times. Evelyn refers to Greek philosophers, who once believed that air was the principle of the earth and primary substance of the soul up until the time that air pollution began to cause ill health.

Original title page of John Evelyn's Fumifugium

== Background ==
Evelyn was appointed to the newly formed Royal Society, and both Society and pamphlet are celebrated in the 1663 "Ballad of Gresham College". Stanza 23 (given here in modern English) describes how Evelyn

[...] shows that 'tis the sea-coal smoke

That always London does environ,
Which does our lungs and spirits choke,
Our hanging spoil, and rust our iron.
Let none at Fumifuge be scoffing

Who heard at Church our Sunday's coughing.

The sea-coal to which Evelyn referred was appropriately named because it came by sea from Newcastle. When burned, it gave off a terrible smell because of high amounts of sulfur in its composition. When burned the sea coal released sulfur dioxide, carbon dioxide, nitric oxide, soot, and particulates of organic matter into the atmosphere. The pamphlet suggests that burning wood, particularly aromatic woods, will be less harmful to the lungs and recommends relocating some of London's more polluting industries outside the capital, in particular lime-burning and brewing.

== Structure and contents ==
Fumifugium is broken down into three parts which explain the problem, a proposed solution, and a way of improvement upon the air in London.

=== Part One ===
The first part of Evelyn's letter describes the details of the problem with the air pollution in London and its effect on human health. He explains that many philosophers believed that air was the most important for the soul and the Earth for we benefit it and therefore it is necessary for survival by the respiration of clean air through the lungs:

It is not without some considerable Analogy, that sundry of the Philosophers have named the Aer the Vehicle of the Soul, as well as of the Earth, and this frail Vessell of ours which contains it; since we all of us finde the benefit which we derive from it. Not onely for the necessity of common Respiration and functions of the Organs; but likewise for the use of Spirits and Primigene Humors, which doe most neerly approach that Divine particle.

=== Part Two ===
The second part of the letter proposes a solution to the current air pollution problem by recommending a removal of all pollution trades from the capital.

=== Part Three ===
In the third part of Evelyn's letter, he describes ways of improving the air quality of London by way of plantations, sweet-smelling flowers and vegetation placed near the city.

== Significance ==
Fumifugium is considered a milestone in the development of air pollution science. In The Big Smoke: A History of Air Pollution in London Since Medieval Times, Peter Brimblecombe comments that "Fumifugium... is an outstanding work and cannot fail to remind the reader that [Evelyn] was a man with extraordinary powers of perception". William M. Cavert, a historian of early British environmental history, considers it "... the most extensive, sophisticated, and ambitious analysis of urban air pollution produced anywhere during the early modern period". Todd Andrew Borlik, a specialist in Renaissance literature, argues that Fumifugium is "one of the first sustained polemics against air pollution, and not only diagnoses the crisis but also formulates a sophisticated urban planning scheme to combat it".

On the other hand, Mark Jenner, a specialist in early modern history, has argued that it is "too simple" to consider Fumifugium "as a precocious example of environmental concern"; in his view: "Evelyn's celebrated account of London smoke pollution in the 1660s, has consistently been misinterpreted... it was a highly political text centrally concerned with Charles II's recent Restoration". According to Jenner, Fumifugium is not only "suffused with politicized symbolism" and "closely related to the panegyric literature of the early 1660s", but also part of a growing scientific interest in the study of air, including the work of Robert Boyle and Nathaniel Henshaw.

== See also ==
- Smog
