= New Source Review =

US permitting process

A New Source Review (NSR) is a permitting process created by the US Congress in 1977 as part of a series of amendments to the Clean Air Act. The NSR process requires industry to undergo an Environmental Protection Agency pre-construction review for environmental controls if they propose either building new facilities or any modifications to existing facilities that would create a "significant increase" of a regulated pollutant. The legislation allowed "routine scheduled maintenance" to not be covered in the NSR process. Since the terms "significant increase" and "routine scheduled maintenance" were never precisely defined in legislation, they have become a source of contention in many lawsuits filed by the EPA, public interest groups, and utilities.

== Major New Source Review court cases ==
=== Wisconsin Energy Corporation lawsuit ===
In 1988 the Wisconsin Energy Corporation (WEPCo) submitted an NSR inquiry to the EPA for improvements at its Port Washington plant. The improvements included the replacement and repair of aging equipment including steam turbine generators, major boiler components and significant amounts of asbestos remediation. WEPCo initially believed that the plant, built in 1932, would not be subject to the NSR requirements and would instead fall under "routine maintenance, repair, and replacement". The EPA, however, ruled that the improvements would extend the life of the plant, and constitute a long term and significant increase in the facilities emissions, prompting WEPCo to sue the EPA in federal court.

In 1991 the Seventh Circuit Court of Appeals found that the EPA had improperly interpreted the NSR and ruled that work that "does not 'change or alter' the design or nature of the facility", would render the facility exempt from the NSR rules. Rather, it merely allows the facility to operate again as it had before the specific equipment deteriorated." The appeals court also ruled that WEPCo would not emit any more pollutants after the improvements, and agreed with WEPCo that its emissions would actually decrease and that the EPA had miscalculated its estimation of the plants emissions. However the court did agree with the EPA that the repairs and modifications to the plant did not constitute "routine maintenance" After the WEPCo ruling, the EPA continued to take a case-by-case approach to NSR's at facilities built before 1977, viewing the court's ruling as applying to the power sector specifically and not to all similar NSR applications in general.

=== Duke Energy ===
Between 1998 and 2000, Charlotte based Duke Energy made 29 modifications and upgrades to several of its coal-generated units. These modifications, like the ones at WEPCo, had no impact on unit emission and were designed to replace or upgrade older equipment. Duke did not apply for or obtain permits from the EPA for this work, and were sued. The EPA argued that the modifications and upgrades could significantly increase the dispatch capacity of the units, and allow them to operate at higher outputs for longer periods of time, placing Duke in excess of the EPA's Prevention of Significant Deterioration (PSD), requiring an automatic NSR.

Duke Energy initially prevailed in both the trial as well as the appeal in front of the Fourth Circuit Court of Appeals, when they ruled that the EPA's rulings were inconsistent with prior decisions and that the EPA's previous interpretation of the NSR would also have to be applied to its application of its PSD rule. The EPA, along with the North Carolina Sierra Club appealed the decision to the Supreme Court, which in a unanimous decision, overturned the Fourth Circuit's decision. The Court ruled the term "modification" did not have the same meaning in the PSD and NSPS provisions.

=== Bush administration ===
Environmental groups expressed strong anger toward the EPA's decision in August 2003 to significantly relax the New Source Review provisions of the Clean Air Act, arguing that it will substantially harm the quality of the air, increase respiratory ailments, such as asthma, and cause thousands of premature deaths. Furthermore, a report by the General Accounting Office, the investigative arm of Congress, said that the EPA had relied not on scientific evidence but merely on anecdotal evidence from utilities to build a case for the new law. Because the changes to the New Source Review substantially weaken the Clean Air Act's ability to prevent pollution and cause many existing enforcement efforts to be dropped, twelve states (New York, Connecticut, Maine, Maryland, Massachusetts, New Hampshire, New Mexico, New Jersey, Pennsylvania, Rhode Island, Vermont, and Wisconsin) and the District of Columbia sued the Bush Administration in October 2003 to block the changes to the New Source Review that are seen as a major rollback of the Clean Air Act and a hazard to public health. On December 24, 2003, a federal court ruled that the new NSR rules could not go into effect until the lawsuit had been fully adjudicated. When the new rules were being proposed, the EPA administrator claimed that the new rules would not stop any enforcement actions against utilities that had been started under the previous administration and were still ongoing, but shortly after the rules were adopted, the EPA decided to drop most of those lawsuits.

== State involvement ==
In the 1990s, EPA began an initiative to enforce new source review requirements against coal-fired power plants. The EPA effort was often supplemented by separate enforcement actions filed by the states and non-governmental organizations filing or intervening as co-plaintiffs under private causes of action in the Clean Air Act. Defendant's opposed states serving as intervenors and co-plaintiffs arguing that plaintiffs were interpreting the law more stringently than it was designed. The results of the initiative varied.

== See also ==
- Best Available Control Technology
