= National Ambient Air Quality Standards =

US EPA limits on certain air pollutants

U.S. counties that are designated "nonattainment" for the Clean Air Act's NAAQS, as of September 30, 2017

The U.S. National Ambient Air Quality Standards (NAAQS /næks/ NAKS) are limits on atmospheric concentration of six pollutants that cause smog, acid rain, and other health hazards. Established by the United States Environmental Protection Agency (EPA) under authority of the Clean Air Act (42 U.S.C. 7401 et seq.), NAAQS is applied for outdoor air throughout the country.

The six criteria air pollutants (CAP), or criteria pollutants, for which limits are set in the NAAQS are ozone (O_{3}), atmospheric particulate matter (PM_{2.5}/PM_{10}), lead (Pb), carbon monoxide (CO), sulfur oxides (SO_{x}), and nitrogen oxides (NO_{x}). These are typically emitted from many sources in industry, mining, transportation, electricity generation, and agriculture. In many cases, they are the products of the combustion of fossil fuels or industrial processes.

The National Emissions Standards for Hazardous Air Pollutants cover many other chemicals, and require the maximum achievable reduction that the EPA determines is feasible.

A 2025 study found that NAAQS has generated more than a trillion dollars in welfare gains since 1997. Implementing a more stringent emissions policy would nearly triple the welfare gains.

== Background ==
The six criteria air pollutants were the first set of pollutants recognized by the United States Environmental Protection Agency as needing standards on a national level. The Clean Air Act requires the EPA to set US National Ambient Air Quality Standards (NAAQS) for the six CAPs. The NAAQS are health based and the EPA sets two types of standards: primary and secondary. The primary standards are designed to protect the health of 'sensitive' populations such as asthmatics, children, and the elderly. The secondary standards are concerned with protecting the environment. They are designed to address visibility, damage to crops, vegetation, buildings, and animals.

The EPA established the NAAQS according to Sections 108 and 109 of the U.S. Clean Air Act, which was last amended in 1990. These sections require the EPA "(1) to list widespread air pollutants that reasonably may be expected to endanger public health or welfare; (2) to issue air quality criteria for them that assess the latest available scientific information on nature and effects of ambient exposure to them; (3) to set primary NAAQS to protect human health with an adequate margin of safety and to set secondary NAAQS to protect against welfare effects (e.g., effects on vegetation, ecosystems, visibility, climate, manmade materials, etc.); and (5) to periodically review and revise, as appropriate, the criteria and NAAQS for a given listed pollutant or class of pollutants."

== Descriptions ==
1. Ground level ozone (O_{3}): Ozone found on the surface-level, also known as tropospheric ozone, is also regulated by the NAAQS under the Clean Air Act. Ozone was originally found to be damaging to grapes in the 1950s. The US EPA set "oxidants" standards in 1971, which included ozone. These standards were created to reduce agricultural impacts and other related damages. Like lead, ozone requires a reexamination of new findings of health and vegetation effects periodically. This aspect necessitated the creation of a US EPA criteria document. Further analysis done in 1979 and 1997 made it necessary to significantly modify the pollution standards.
2. Atmospheric particulate matter
  - PM_{10}, coarse particles: 2.5 micrometers (μm) to 10 μm in size (although current implementation includes all particles 10 μm or less in the standard)
  - PM_{2.5}, fine particles: 2.5 μm in size or less. Particulate Matter (PM) was listed in the 1996 Criteria document issued by the EPA. In April 2001, the EPA created a Second External Review Draft of the Air Quality Criteria for PM, which addressed updated studies done on particulate matter and the modified pollutant standards done since the First External Review Draft. In May 2002, a Third External Review Draft was made, and the EPA revised PM requirements again. After issuing a fourth version of the document, the EPA issued the final version in October 2004.
3. Lead (Pb): In the mid-1970s, lead was listed as a criteria air pollutant that required NAAQS regulation. In 1977, the EPA published a document which detailed the Air Quality Criteria for lead. This document was based on the scientific assessments of lead at the time. Based on this report (1977 Lead AQCD), the EPA established a "1.5 μg/m^{3} (maximum quarterly calendar average) Pb NAAQS in 1978." The Clean Air Act requires periodic review of NAAQS, and new scientific data published after 1977 made it necessary to revise the standards previously established in the 1977 Lead AQCD document. An Addendum to the document was published in 1986 and then again as a Supplement to the 1986 AQCD/Addendum in 1990. In 1990, a Lead Staff Paper was prepared by the EPA's Office of Air Quality Planning and Standards (OPQPS), which was based on information presented in the 1986 Lead/AQCD/Addendum and 1990 Supplement, in addition to other OAQPS sponsored lead exposure/risk analyses. In this paper, it was proposed that the Pb NAAQS be revised further and presented options for revision to the EPA. The EPA elected to not modify the Pb NAAQS further, but decided to instead focus on the 1991 U.S. EPA Strategy for Reducing Lead Exposure. The EPA concentrated on regulatory and remedial clean-up efforts to minimize Pb exposure from numerous non-air sources that caused more severe public health risks, and undertook actions to reduce air emissions.
4. Carbon monoxide (CO): The EPA set the first NAAQS for carbon monoxide in 1971. The primary standard was set at 9 ppm averaged over an 8-hour period and 35 ppm over a 1-hour period. The majority of CO emitted into the ambient air is from mobile sources. The EPA has reviewed and assessed the current scientific literature with respect to CO in 1979, 1984, 1991, and 1994. After the review in 1984 the EPA decided to remove the secondary standard for CO due to lack of significant evidence of the adverse environmental impacts. On January 28, 2011, the EPA decided that the current NAAQS for CO were sufficient and proposed to keep the existing standards as they stood. The EPA is strengthening monitoring requirements for CO by calling for CO monitors to be placed in strategic locations near large urban areas. Specifically, the EPA has called for monitors to be placed and operational in CBSA's (core based statistical areas) with populations over 2.5 million by January 1, 2015; and in CBSA's with populations of 1 million or more by January 1, 2017. In addition they are requiring the collocation of CO monitors with NO_{2} monitors in urban areas having a population of 1 million for more. As of May 2011 there were approximately 328 operational CO monitors in place nationwide. The EPA has provided some authority to the EPA Regional Administrators to oversee case-by-case requested exceptions and in determining the need for additional monitoring systems above the minimum required. The EPA reports the national average concentration of CO has decreased by 82% since 1980. The last nonattainment designation was deemed in attainment on September 27, 2010. Currently all areas in the US are in attainment.
5. Sulfur oxides (SO_{x}): SO_{x} refers to the oxides of sulfur, a highly reactive group of gases. SO_{2} is of greatest interest and is used as the indicator for the entire SO_{x} family. The EPA first set primary and secondary standards in 1971. Dual primary standards were set at 140 ppb averaged over a 24-hour period, and at 30 ppb averaged annually. The secondary standard was set at 500 ppb averaged over a 3-hour period, not to be exceeded more than once a year. The most recent review took place in 1996 during which the EPA considered implementing a new NAAQS for 5-minute peaks of SO_{2} affecting sensitive populations such as asthmatics. The Agency did not establish this new NAAQS and kept the existing standards. In 2010 the EPA decided to replace the dual primary standards with a new 1-hour standard set at 75 ppb. On March 20, 2012, the EPA "took final action" to maintain the existing NAAQS as they stood. Only three monitoring sites have exceeded the current NAAQS for SO_{2}, all of which are located in the Hawaii Volcanoes National Park. The violations occurred between 2007–2008 and the state of Hawaii suggested these should be exempt from regulatory actions due to an 'exceptional event' (volcanic activity). Since 1980 the national concentration of SO_{2} in the ambient air has decreased by 83%. Annual average concentrations hover between 1–6 ppb. Currently all ACQR's are in attainment for SO_{2}.
6. Nitrogen oxides (NO_{x}): The EPA first set primary and secondary standards for the oxides of nitrogen in 1971. Among these are nitric oxide (NO), nitrous oxide (N_{2}O), and nitrogen dioxide (NO_{2}), all of which are covered in the NAAQS. NO_{2} is the oxide measured and used as the indicator for the entire NO_{x} family as it is of the most concern due to its quick formation and contribution to the formation of harmful ground level ozone. In 1971 the primary and secondary NAAQS for NO_{2} were both set at an annual average of 0.053 ppm. The EPA reviewed this NAAQS in 1985 and 1996, and in both cases concluded that the existing standard was sufficient. The most recent review by the EPA occurred in 2010, resulting in a new 1-hour NO_{2} primary standard set at 100 ppb; the annual average of 0.053 ppm remained the same. Also considered was a new 1-hour secondary standard of 100 ppb. This was the first time the EPA reviewed the environmental impacts separate from the health impacts for this group of criteria air pollutants. Also, in 2010, the EPA decided to ensure compliance by strengthening monitoring requirements, calling for increased numbers of monitoring systems near large urban areas and major roadways. On March 20, 2012, the EPA "took final action" to maintain the existing NAAQS as they stand. The national average of NO_{x} concentrations has dropped by 52% since 1980. The annual concentration for NO_{2} is reported to be averaging around 10–20 ppb, and is expected to decrease further with new mobile source regulations. Currently all areas of the US are classified as in attainment.

In April 2023, the EPA finalized its "Good Neighbor Plan", which phases in tighter standards for NO_{x}, using a cap and trade system during the summer "ozone season". This is intended to reduce ground-level ozone in non-attainment areas downwind of industrial sources like power plants, incinerators, and industrial furnaces, often in other states.

== Standards ==
The standards are listed in 40 CFR 50. Primary standards are designed to protect human health, with an adequate margin of safety, including sensitive populations such as children, the elderly, and individuals suffering from respiratory diseases. Secondary standards are designed to protect public welfare, damage to property, transportation hazards, economic values, and personal comfort and well-being from any known or anticipated adverse effects of a pollutant. A district meeting a given standard is known as an "attainment area" for that standard, and otherwise a "non-attainment area".

Standards are required to "accurately reflect the latest scientific knowledge," and are reviewed every five years by a Clean Air Scientific Advisory Committee (CASAC), consisting of "seven members appointed by the EPA administrator."

EPA has set NAAQS for six major pollutants listed as below. These six are also the criteria air pollutants.

Pollutant	Type	Standard	Averaging Time	Exceedance Criteria	Regulatory Citation
Sulfur dioxide (SO_{2})	Primary	75 ppb	1-hour	99th Percentile of 1-hour daily maximum concentrations, averaged over 3 years	40 CFR 50.17
Sulfur dioxide (SO_{2})	Secondary	0.5 ppm (1,300 μg/m^{3})	3-hour	Not to be exceeded more than once per year	40 CFR 50.5
Particulate matter (PM_{10})	Primary and Secondary	150 μg/m^{3}	24-hour	Not to be exceeded more than once per year on average over 3 years	40 CFR 50.6
Fine particulate matter (PM_{2.5})	Primary	9.0 μg/m^{3} (12 μg/m^{3} prior to May 6, 2024)	annual	Annual mean, averaged over 3 years	40 CFR 50.18
Fine particulate matter (PM_{2.5})	Secondary	15 μg/m^{3}	annual	Annual mean, averaged over 3 years	40 CFR 50.7
Fine particulate matter (PM_{2.5})	Primary and Secondary	35 μg/m^{3}	24-hour	98th percentile, averaged over 3 years	40 CFR 50.18
Carbon monoxide (CO)	Primary	35 ppm (40 mg/m^{3})	1-hour	Not to be exceeded more than once per year	40 CFR 50.8
Carbon monoxide (CO)	Primary	9 ppm (10 mg/m^{3})	8-hour	Not to be exceeded more than once per year	40 CFR 50.8
Ozone (O_{3})	Primary and Secondary	0.12 ppm (235 μg/m^{3})	1-hour^{a}	expected number of days per calendar year, with maximum hourly average concentration greater than 0.12 ppm, is equal to or less than 1	40 CFR 50.9
Ozone (O_{3})	Primary and Secondary	0.070 ppm (140 μg/m^{3})	8-hour	Annual fourth-highest daily maximum 8-hour concentration, averaged over 3 years	40 CFR 50.19
Nitrogen dioxide (NO_{2})	Primary and Secondary	0.053 ppm (100 μg/m^{3})	annual	Annual mean	40 CFR 50.11
Nitrogen dioxide (NO_{2})	Primary	0.100 ppm (188 μg/m^{3})	1-hour	98th percentile of 1-hour daily maximum, averaged over 3 years	40 CFR 50.11
Lead (Pb)	Primary and Secondary	0.15 μg/m^{3}	Rolling 3 months	Not to be exceeded	40 CFR 50.12

- ^aAs of June 15, 2005, the 1-hour ozone standard no longer applies to areas designated with respect to the 8-hour ozone standard (which includes most of the United States, except for portions of 10 states).
- Source: USEPA

== Detection methods ==
The EPA National Exposure Research Laboratory can designate a measurement device using an established technological basis as a Federal Reference Method (FRM) to certify that the device has undergone a testing and analysis protocol, and can be used to monitor NAAQS compliance. Devices based on new technologies can be designated as a Federal Equivalent Method (FEM). FEMs are based on different sampling and/or analyzing technologies than FRMs, but are required to provide the same decision making quality when making NAAQS attainment determinations. Approved new methods are formally announced through publication in the Federal Register. A complete list of FRMs and FEMs is available.

== Air quality control region ==
An air quality control region is an area, designated by the federal government, where communities share a common air pollution problem.

== See also ==
- Air pollution
- Air quality index
- Asthma
- Atmospheric dispersion modeling
- Contamination control
- Clean Air Act (1990)
- Portable emissions measurement system
- Toxic Substances Control Act of 1976
