= Great Smog of London =

1952 air pollution event

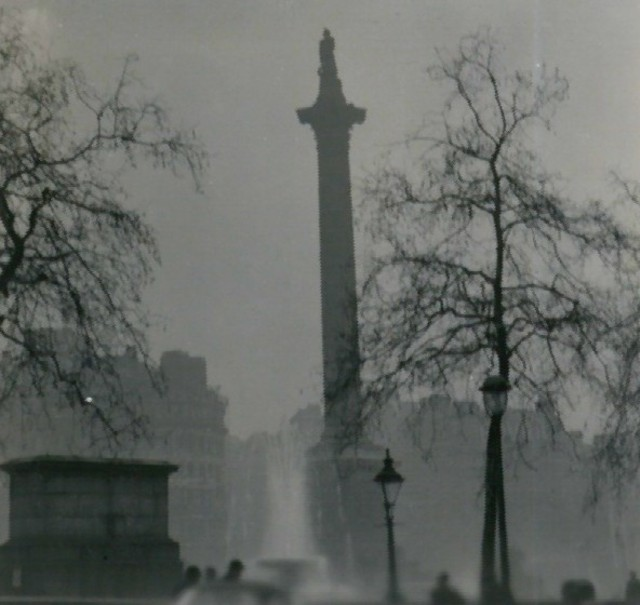
- Nelson's Column during the Great Smog
- Date: 5–9 December 1952
- Location: London, England; 51.5°N 0.2°W
- Casualties: Unknown number affected by breathing difficulties, lung cancer and bronchitis
- Deaths: 4,000 killed (1952 government estimate); 10,000–12,000 killed (modern estimate)
- Injuries: 100,000 (1952 government estimate)

The Great Smog was a severe air pollution event that affected London, England, in December 1952. A period of unusually cold weather, combined with an anticyclone and windless conditions, collected airborne pollutants—mostly arising from the use of coal—to form a thick layer of smog over the city. It lasted from Friday, 5 December, to Tuesday, 9 December 1952, then dispersed quickly when the weather changed.

The smog caused major disruption by reducing visibility and even penetrating indoor areas, far more severely than previous smog events, called "pea-soupers". Government medical reports in the weeks following the event estimated that up to 4,000 people had died as a direct result of the smog and 100,000 more were made ill by the smog's effects on the human respiratory tract. More recent research suggests that the total number of fatalities was considerably greater, with estimates of between 10,000 and 12,000 deaths.

London's poor air quality had been a problem since at least the 13th century. The diarist John Evelyn had written about "the inconveniencie of the aer and smoak of London [sic]" in Fumifugium, the first book written about air pollution, in 1661. However, the Great Smog was many times worse than anything the city had ever experienced before: it is thought to be the worst air pollution event in the history of the United Kingdom, and the most significant for its effects on environmental research, government regulation, and public awareness of the relationship between air quality and health. It led to several changes in practices and regulations, including the Clean Air Act 1956.

== Background ==
=== Sources of pollution ===
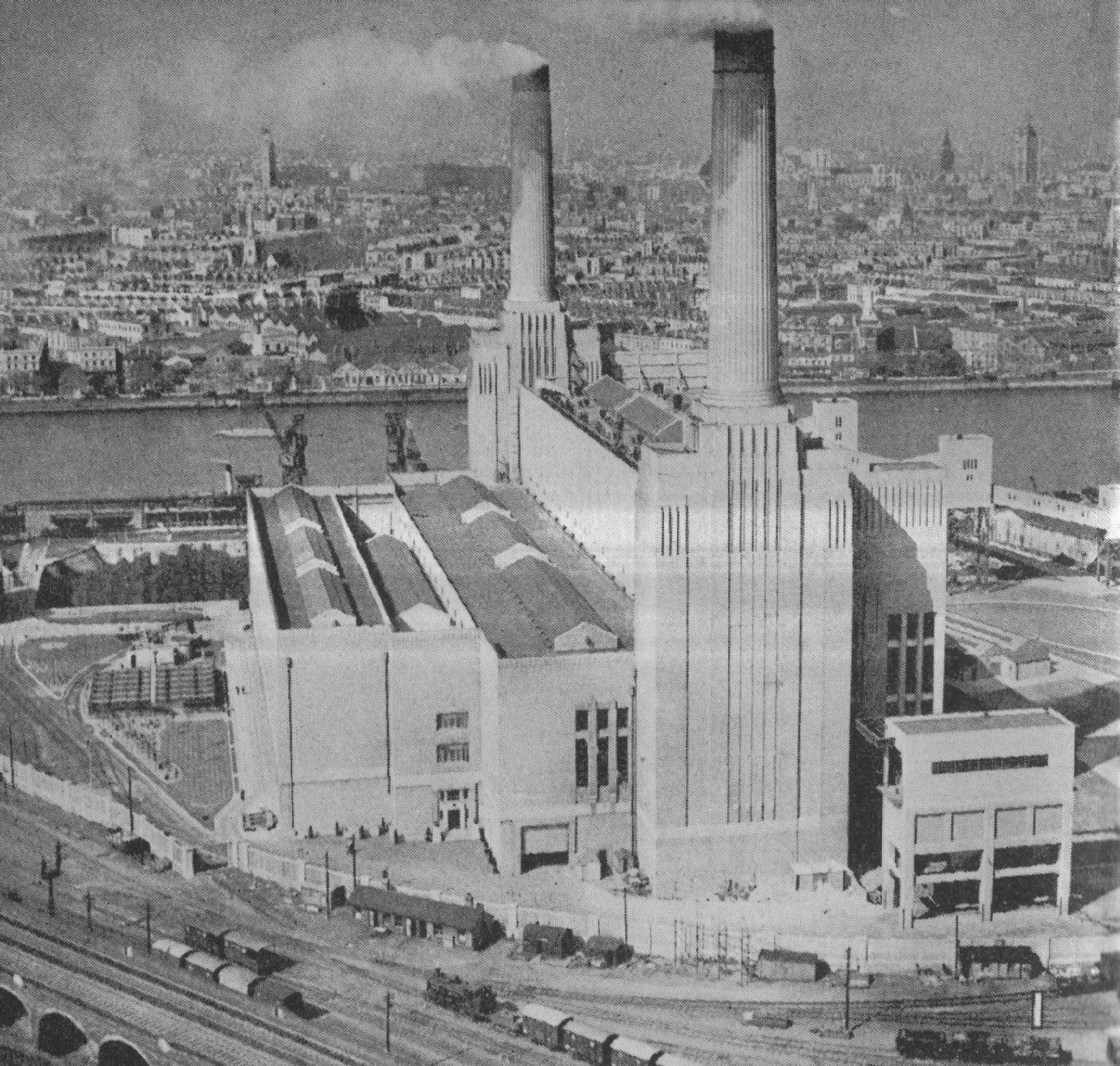
Battersea Power Station in 1938

A period of unusually cold weather preceding and during the Great Smog led Londoners to burn much more coal than usual to keep themselves warm. While better-quality "hard" coals (such as anthracite) tended to be exported to pay off World War II debts, post-war domestic coal tended to be of a relatively low-grade, sulphurous variety called "nutty slack" (similar to lignite) which increased the amount of sulphur dioxide in the smoke. There were also numerous coal-fired electric power stations in the Greater London area, including Fulham, Battersea, Bankside, Greenwich, West Ham and Kingston upon Thames, all of which added to the pollution. According to the UK's Met Office, the following pollutants were emitted each day during the smoggy period: 1,000 tonnes of smoke particles, 140 tonnes of hydrochloric acid, 14 tonnes of fluorine compounds and 370 tonnes of sulphur dioxide which may have been converted to 800 tonnes of sulphuric acid. The relatively large size of the water droplets in the London fog allowed for the production of sulphates without the acidity of the liquid rising high enough to stop the reaction, and for the resultant dilute acid to become concentrated when the fog was burned away by the sun.

Research suggested that additional pollution-prevention systems fitted at Battersea worsened the air quality. Flue gas washing reduced the temperature of the flue gases so they did not rise, but instead slumped to ground level, causing a local nuisance.

Additionally, there was pollution and smoke from vehicle exhaust, particularly from steam locomotives and diesel-fuelled buses which had replaced the recently abandoned electric tram system. Other industrial and commercial sources also contributed to the air pollution.

=== Weather ===
On 4 December 1952, an anticyclone settled over a windless London, causing a temperature inversion with relatively cool, stagnant air trapped under a layer of warmer air. The resultant fog, mixed with smoke from home and industrial chimneys, particulates such as those from motor vehicle exhausts, and other pollutants such as sulphur dioxide, formed a persistent smog, which blanketed the capital the following day. The presence of tarry particles of soot gave the smog its greenish-yellow colour, hence the nickname "pea-souper". The absence of significant wind prevented its dispersal and allowed an unprecedented accumulation of pollutants.

Although the event is now widely described as the "London" smog, air pollution, in fact, extended far beyond the capital. According to E. T. Wilkins (of the Department of Scientific and Industrial Research, whose measurements would make clear the connection between smoke, sulphur dioxide, and rising deaths), fog, white mist, or grimy smog covered "many parts of the British Isles", while "In London and the Thames Valley, fog or smog covered upwards of 1000 square miles". However, it was in London that the smog's effects were the greatest.

== Effects ==
=== Effect on London ===
There was initially no panic, as London was infamous at that time for its fog. However, this one was denser and longer-lasting than any previous "pea-souper". On Sunday 7 December visibility was reduced to a foot, with one visitor stating that it was "like you were blind", rendering driving difficult or at times impossible.

Public transport other than the London Underground was halted, and the number of vehicular accidents placed ambulance services under severe strain. The smog was so dense that it even seeped indoors, resulting in the cancellation or abandonment of concerts and film screenings, as visibility decreased in large enclosed spaces, and stages and screens became harder to see from the seats. Outdoor sports events were also cancelled.

In the inner London suburbs and away from town centres, there was no disturbance by moving traffic to thin out dense fog in the back streets. As a result, visibility could be down to a metre or so in the daytime. Walking out of doors became a matter of shuffling to feel for potential obstacles such as kerbs. This was made even worse at night since each back street lamp was fitted with an incandescent light bulb, which gave no penetrating light onto the pavement for pedestrians to see their feet or even a lamp post. Fog-penetrating fluorescent lamps did not become widely available until later in the 1950s. "Smog masks" were worn by those who were able to purchase them from chemists.

=== Health effects ===
In the weeks that ensued, statistics compiled by medical services found that the fog had killed 4,000 people. Many of the victims were very young or elderly, or had pre-existing respiratory or cardiovascular problems. In February 1953, Labour MP Marcus Lipton suggested in the House of Commons that the fog had caused 6,000 deaths and that 25,000 more people had claimed sickness benefits in London during that period.

Mortality remained elevated for months after the fog. A preliminary report, never finalised, blamed those deaths on an influenza epidemic. Emerging evidence revealed that only a fraction of the deaths could be from influenza. E. T. Wilkins, who, as Officer in Charge of Atmospheric Pollution at the government's Department of Scientific and Industrial Research and effectively the UK's top pollution expert at the time, plotted a chart of elevated death rates for the period from December 1952 to March 1953 and found that there had been an additional 8,000 deaths beyond those initially counted, making 12,000 in total. Most of the deaths were caused by respiratory tract infections, from hypoxia and as a result of mechanical obstruction of the air passages by catarrh and pus arising from lung infections caused by the smog. The lung infections were mainly bronchopneumonia or acute purulent bronchitis superimposed upon chronic bronchitis.

Research published in 2004 suggests that the number of fatalities was about 12,000, around three to four times greater than the official government total at the time, but very close to the figure Wilkins had originally estimated. In the long term, individuals who were foetuses or infants at the time of the smog ended up having lower intelligence and worse respiratory health than their peers.

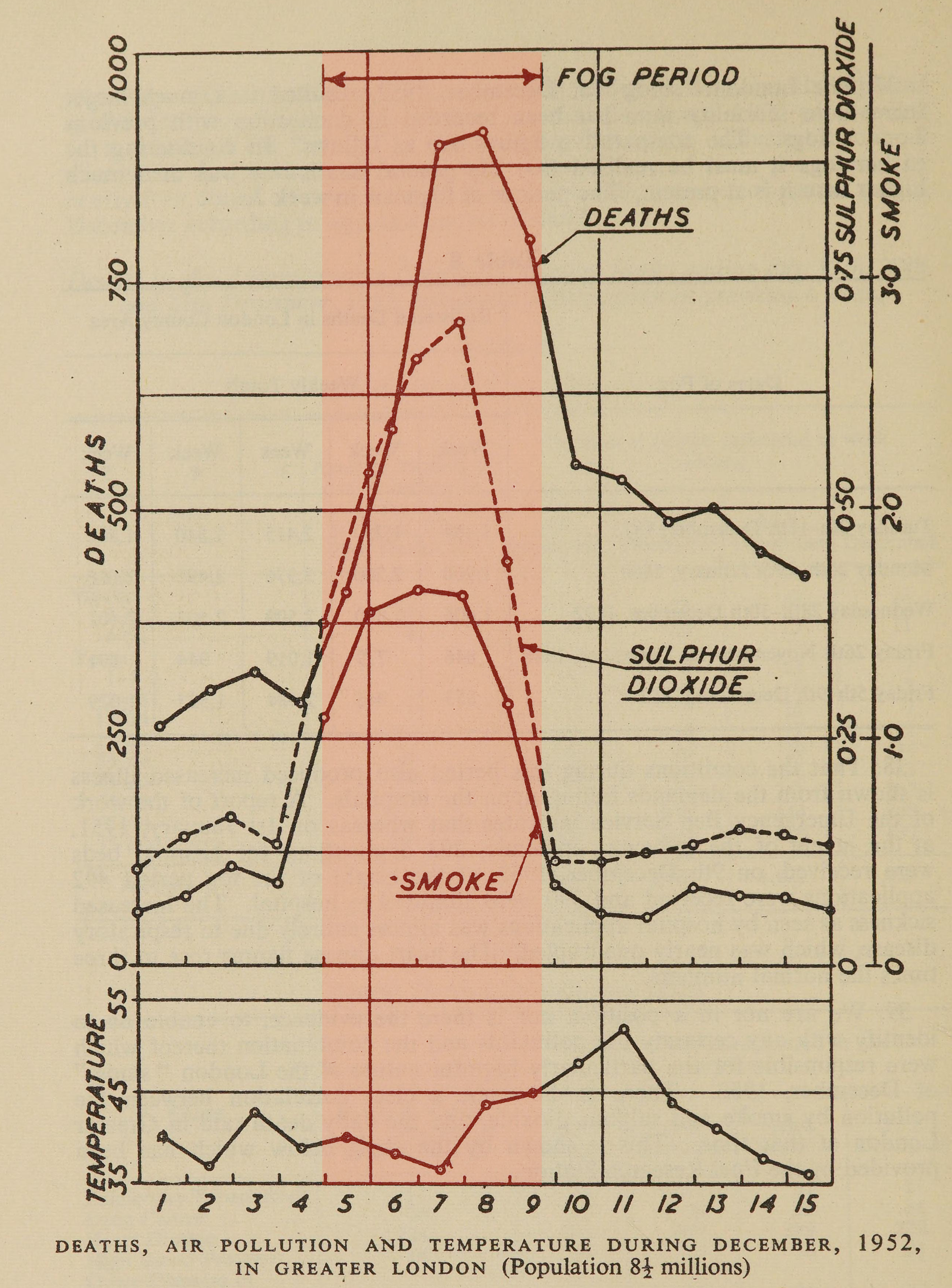
A 1953 report by the UK government's Committee on Air Pollution included this chart showing a "clear correlation between the pollution by smoke and sulphur dioxide, and the daily death rate in London" during the Great London Smog of December 1952.

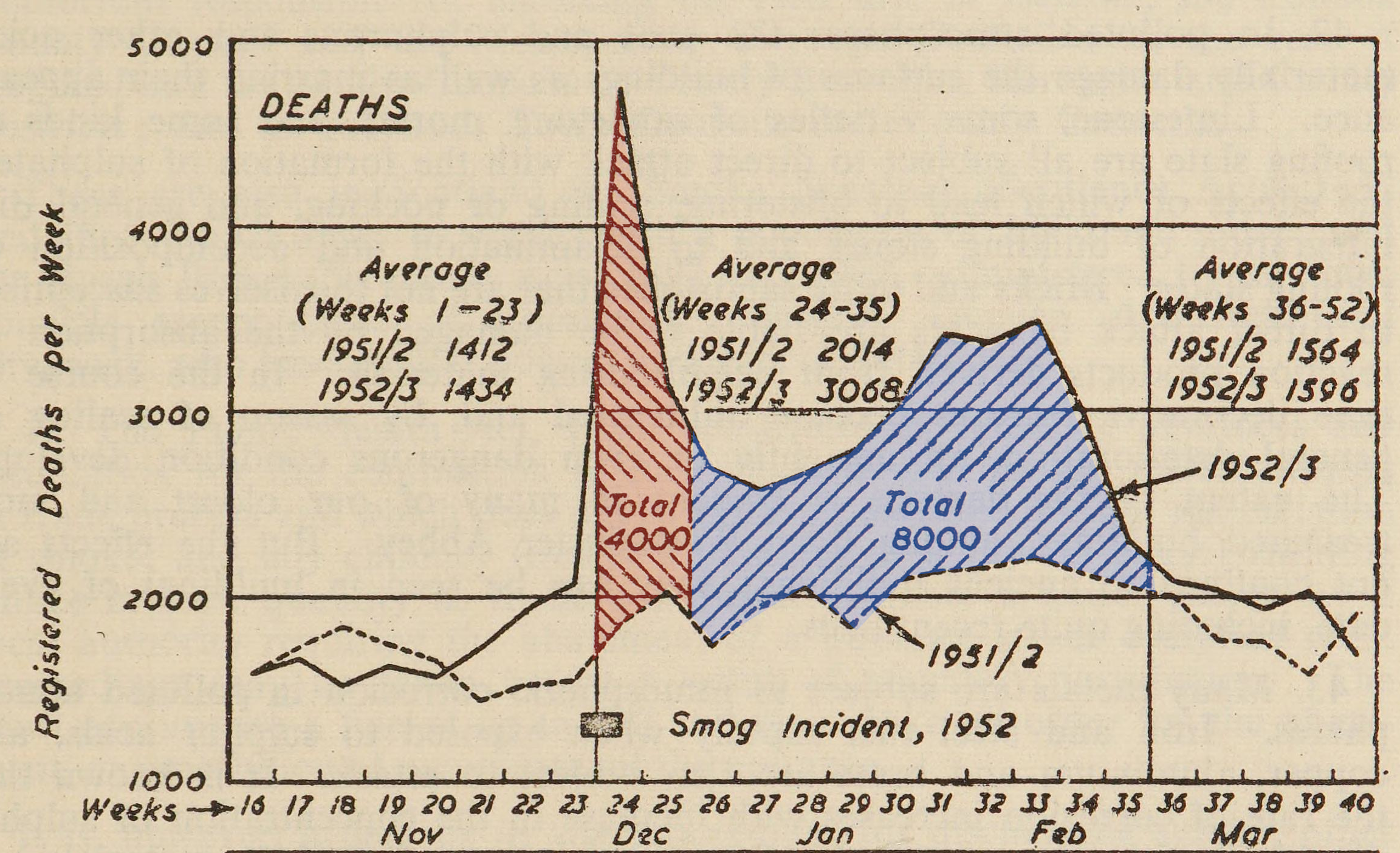
A chart produced by E. T. Wilkins c. 1953 showing an apparent excess of 12,000 deaths in London for the winter 1952–1953 (solid line) compared to the previous year (dotted line). The red shaded area shows the original estimate of 4,000 excess deaths. The blue shaded area shows the additional 8,000 excess deaths, which occurred in the months after the smog, and which were originally attributed to influenza.

=== Environmental impact ===
Environmental legislation since 1952, such as the City of London (Various Powers) Act 1954 and the Clean Air Acts of 1956 and 1968, led to a reduction in air pollution. Financial incentives were offered to householders to replace open coal fires with alternatives (such as gas fires), or to burn coke instead, which produces minimal smoke. Central heating (using gas, electricity, oil, or permitted solid fuel) was rare in most dwellings at that time, not finding favour until the late 1960s onwards. Despite improvements, insufficient progress had been made to prevent one further smog event ten years later, in early December 1962.

== In media ==
An episode of The Goon Show entitled "Forog", broadcast on the BBC Home Service on 21 December 1954, was a thinly veiled satire on the killer fog crisis. The script by Eric Sykes and Spike Milligan concerned the statues of London's monuments, who could get up and move about the city undisturbed only at times when it was enveloped in a characteristic smog. Government-sponsored scientific research sought to dispense with the choking fog, to the annoyance of the statues. It is the background for E. C. R. Lorac's 1954 mystery Shroud of Darkness. The D. E. Stevenson novel The Tall Stranger (1957) opens with a dense "fog" that penetrates indoors and endangers hospital patients, in an apparent reference to the 1952 smog event.

The Great Smog is the central focus of season 1, episode 4 of Netflix's The Crown. The portrayal of the event was regarded as reasonably accurate by critics, although the political importance and the chaos in the hospitals were thought to have been greatly exaggerated.

The Great Smog is the setting of the Doctor Who audio play The Creeping Death and the novel Amorality Tale. The Boris Starling novel Visibility is set in the 1952 smog event. In C. J. Sansom's 2012 alternate reality book Dominion a key plot point develops during the event. The video game Reverse: 1999 version 2.3 story "London Dawning" features a setting heavily inspired by the Great Smog, including characters who are inspired by it and having the smog as the main antagonist.

== See also ==
- Air pollution in the United Kingdom
- Great Stink
