= Royal Netherlands Meteorological Institute =

Research institute

Coordinates: 52°06′05″N 5°10′42″E

- Dutch: Koninklijk Nederlands Meteorologisch Instituut
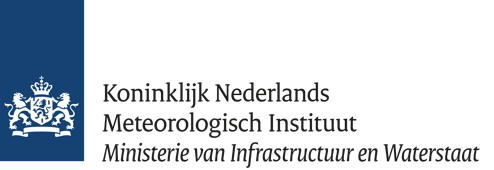

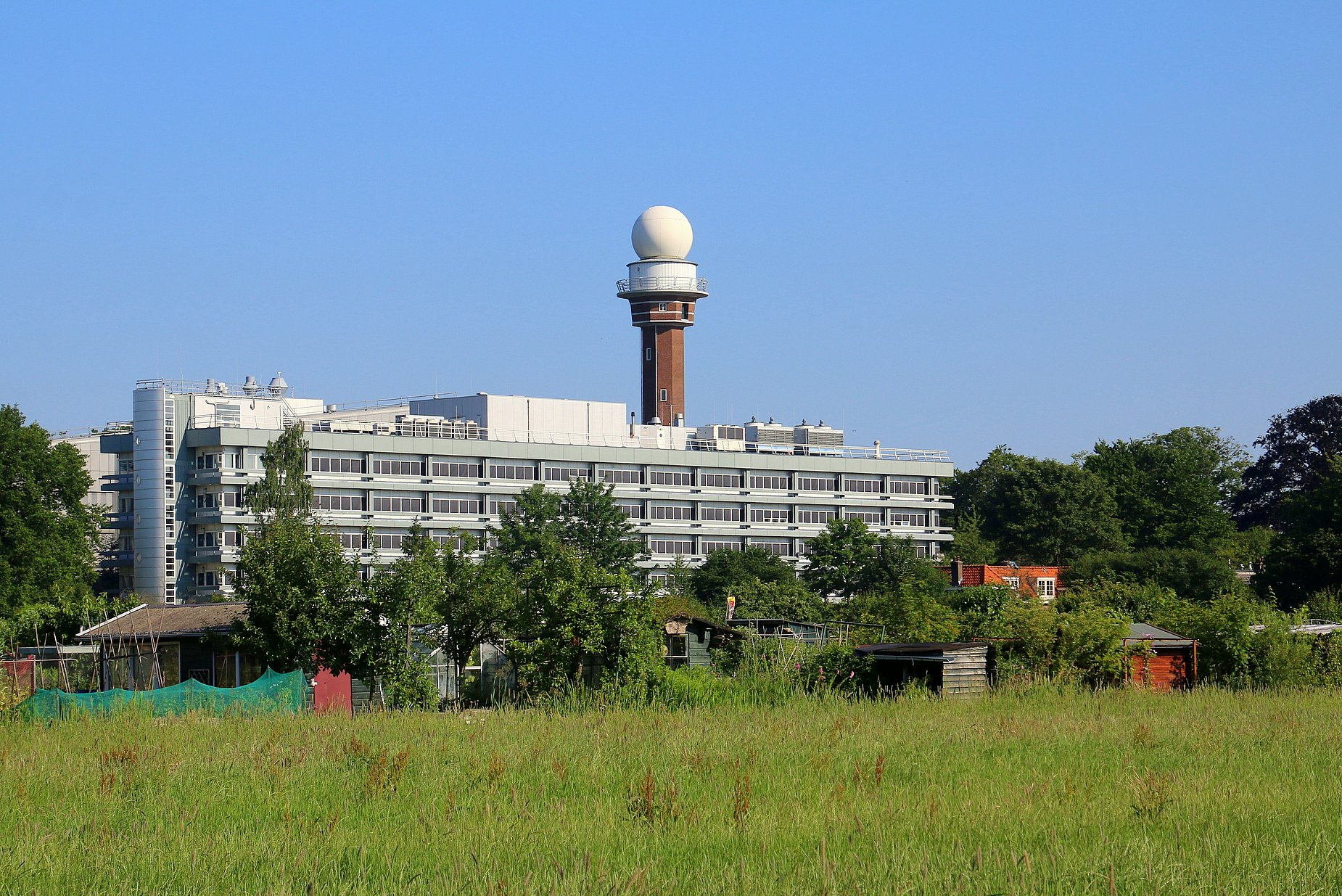
- KNMI headquarters in De Bilt

Agency overview
- Formed: 31 January 1854
- Headquarters: De Bilt, Netherlands
- Employees: 534 (as of 2024)
- Minister responsible: Vincent Karremans, Minister of Infrastructure and Water Management
- Agency executive: Maarten Krispijn van Aalst, Director
- Parent department: Ministry of Infrastructure and Water Management
- Website: www.knmi.nl

The Royal Netherlands Meteorological Institute (Dutch: Koninklijk Nederlands Meteorologisch Instituut, pronounced [ˈkoːnɪŋklək ˈneːdərlɑnts ˌmeːteːjoːroːˈloːɣis ɪnstiˈtyt]; KNMI) is the Dutch national weather forecasting service, which has its headquarters in De Bilt, in the province of Utrecht, central Netherlands.

The primary tasks of KNMI are weather forecasting, monitoring of climate changes and monitoring seismic activity. KNMI is also the national research and information centre for climate, climate change and seismology.

== History ==
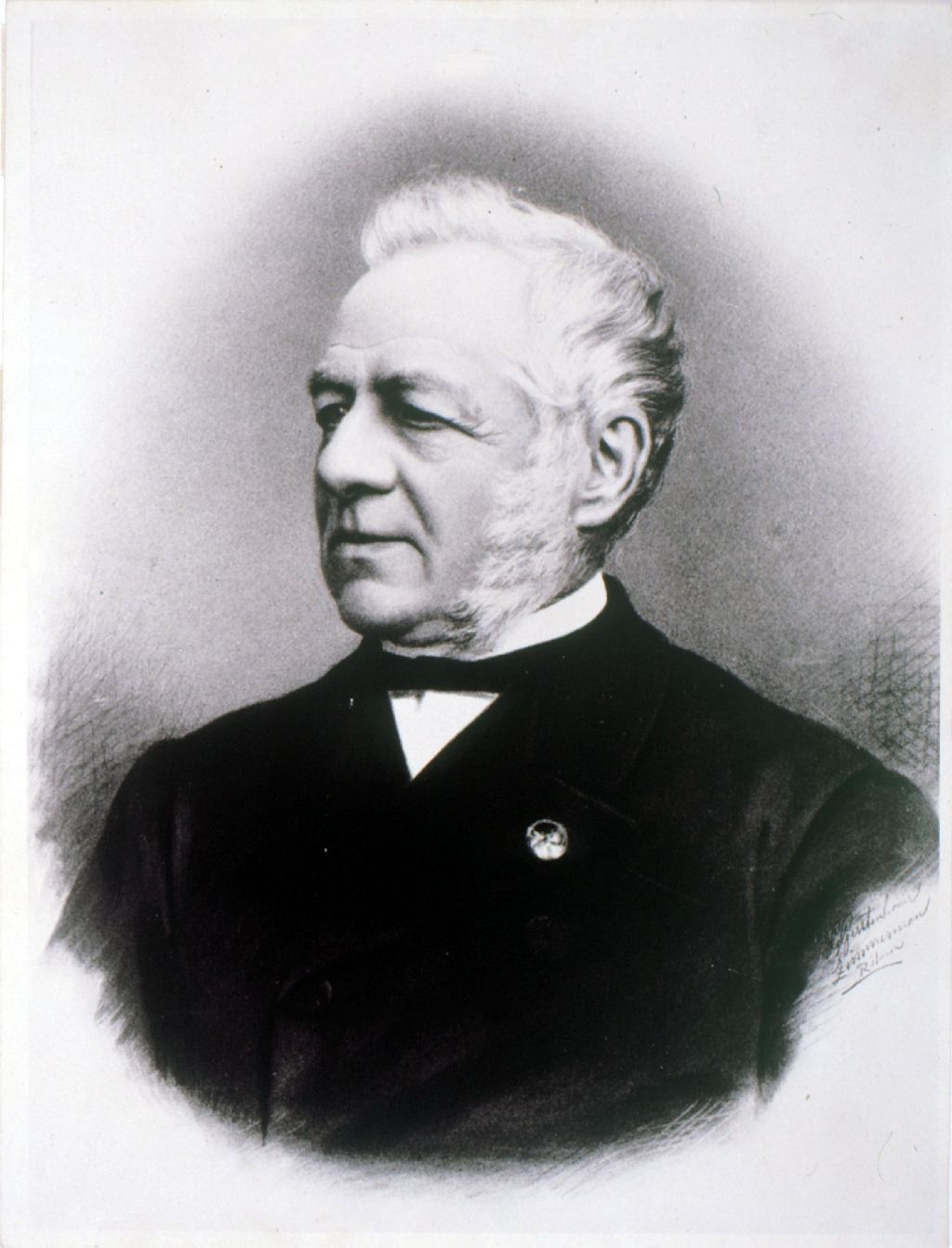
C. H. D. Buys Ballot, 1st director (from 1854 to 1890)

KNMI was established by royal decree of King William III on 31 January 1854 under the title "Royal Meteorological Observatory". Professor C. H. D. Buys Ballot was appointed as the first Director. The year before Professor Ballot had moved the Utrecht University Observatory to the decommissioned fort at Sonnenborgh. It was only later, in 1897, that the headquarters of the KNMI moved to the Koelenberg estate in De Bilt.

The "Royal Meteorological Observatory" originally had two divisions, the land branch under Dr. Frederik Wilhelm Christiaan Krecke and the marine branch under navy Lt. Marin H. Jansen.

Like Robert FitzRoy who founded the Meteorological Office in Britain the same year, Ballot was disenchanted with the non-scientific weather reports found in European newspapers at the time. Like the Met Office, the KNMI also pioneered daily weather predictions, which he called by a new combination "weervoorspelling" (weather prognostication).

== Research ==
Applied research at KNMI is focused on three areas:

- Research aimed at improving the quality, usefulness and accessibility of meteorological and oceanographical data in support of operational weather forecasting and other applications of such data.
- Climate-related research on oceanography; atmospheric boundary layer processes, clouds and radiation; the chemical composition of the atmosphere (e.g. ozone); climate variability research; the analysis of climate, climate variability and climatic change; modelling support and policy support to the Dutch Government with respect to climate and climatic change.
- Seismological research as well as monitoring of seismic activity (earthquakes).

== Development of atmospheric dispersion models ==
KNMI's applied research also encompasses the development and operational use of atmospheric dispersion models.

Whenever a disaster occurs within Europe which causes the emission of toxic gases or radioactive material into the atmosphere, it is of utmost importance to quickly determine where the atmospheric plume of toxic material is being transported by the prevailing winds and other meteorological factors. At such times, KNMI activates a special calamity service. For this purpose, a group of seven meteorologists is constantly on call day and night. KNMI's role in supplying information during emergencies is included in municipal and provincial disaster management plans. Civil services, fire departments and the police can be provided with weather and other relevant information directly by the meteorologist on duty, through dedicated telephone connections.

KNMI has available two atmospheric dispersion models for use by their calamity service:

- PUFF - In cooperation with the Netherlands National Institute for Public Health and the Environment (Dutch: Rijksinstituut voor Volksgezondheid en Milieuhygiene or simply RIVM), KNMI has developed the dispersion model PUFF. It has been designed to calculate the dispersion of air pollution on European scales. The model was originally tested by using measurements of the dispersion of radioactivity caused by the accident in the nuclear power plant of Chernobyl in 1986. A few years later, in 1994, a dedicated dispersion experiment called ETEX (European Tracer EXperiment) was carried out, which also provided useful data for further testing of PUFF.
- CALM - CALM is a CALamity Model designed for the calculation of air pollution dispersion on small spatial scales, within the Netherlands. The algorithms and parameters contained in the CALM model are practically identical to that of the PUFF model. However, the meteorological input can only be supplied manually in CALM. The user provides both observed and predicted values for wind velocity at the 10 meter height level, the atmospheric stability classification and the mixing height. After the model calculations have been performed, a map is created and displayed with the derived trajectories of the pollution plume and an indication of how and where the cloud will disperse.

== Storm naming ==
In 2019 KNMI decided to join the western storm naming group to help awareness of the danger of storms, the first named storm was Storm Ciara on 9 February 2020.

== See also ==
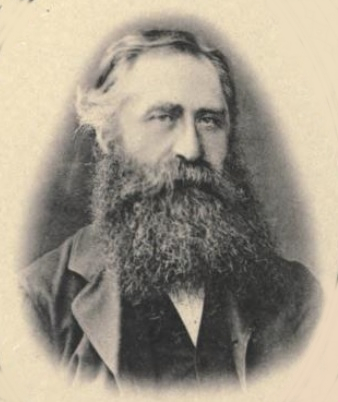
Maurits Snellen, 2nd director (from 1890 to 1902)

- Atmospheric dispersion modeling
- List of atmospheric dispersion models
- National Center for Atmospheric Research
- NERI, the National Environmental Research Institute of Denmark
- NILU, the Norwegian Institute for Air Research
- Roadway air dispersion modeling
- Swedish Meteorological and Hydrological Institute
- TA Luft
- UK Atmospheric Dispersion Modelling Liaison Committee
- UK Dispersion Modelling Bureau
- University Corporation for Atmospheric Research
