= Finnish Meteorological Institute =

Government weather data and forecasting agency

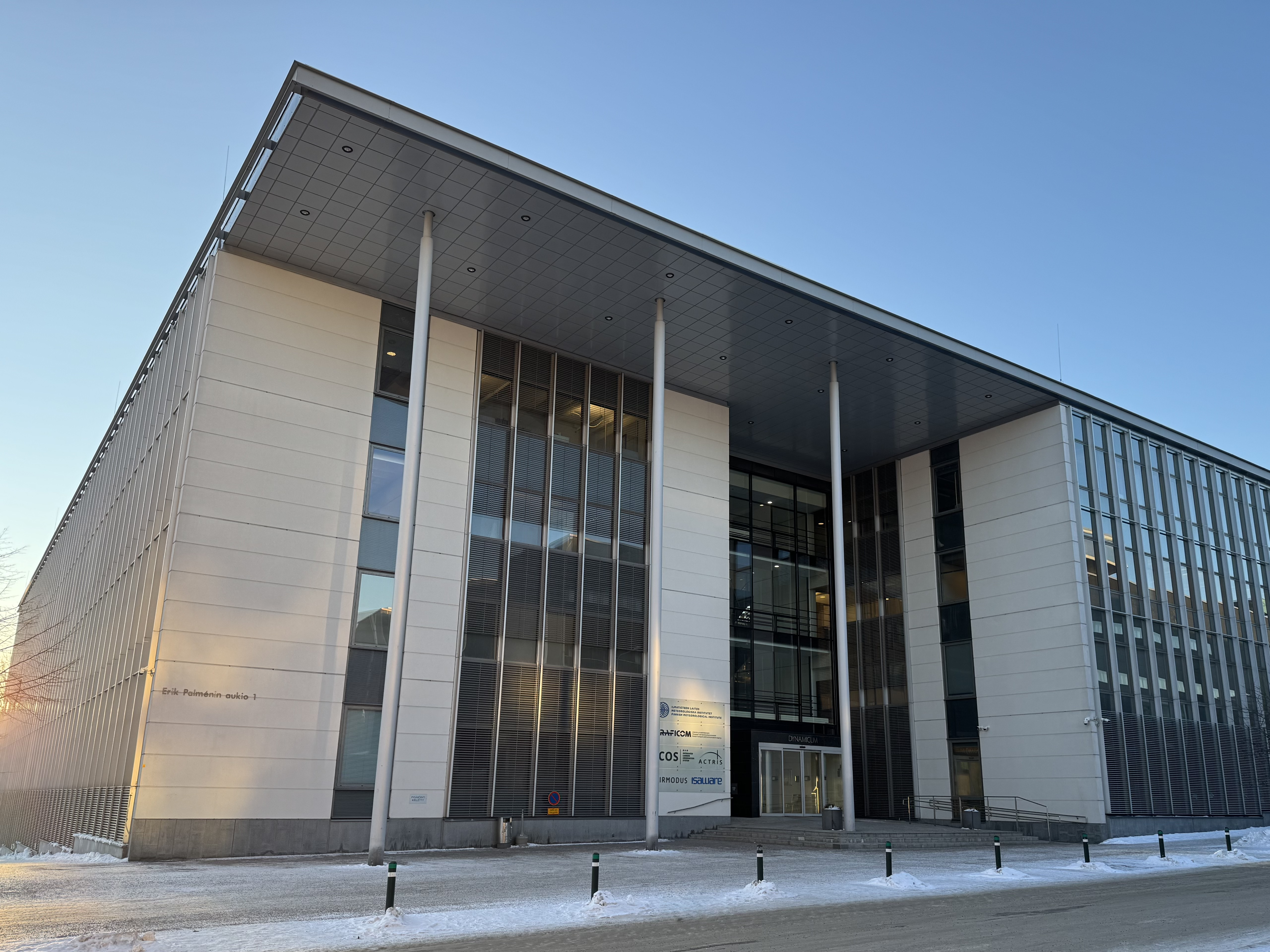
Dynamicum, the building where the Finnish Meteorological Institute is located in Helsinki.

The Finnish Meteorological Institute (FMI; Finnish: Ilmatieteen laitos; Swedish: Meteorologiska institutet) is the government agency responsible for gathering and reporting weather data and forecasts in Finland. It is a part of the Ministry of Transport and Communications but it operates semi-autonomously.

The Institute is an impartial research and service organisation with expertise covering a wide range of atmospheric science activities other than gathering and reporting weather data and forecasts. The headquarters of the Institute is in Kumpula Campus, Helsinki, Finland.

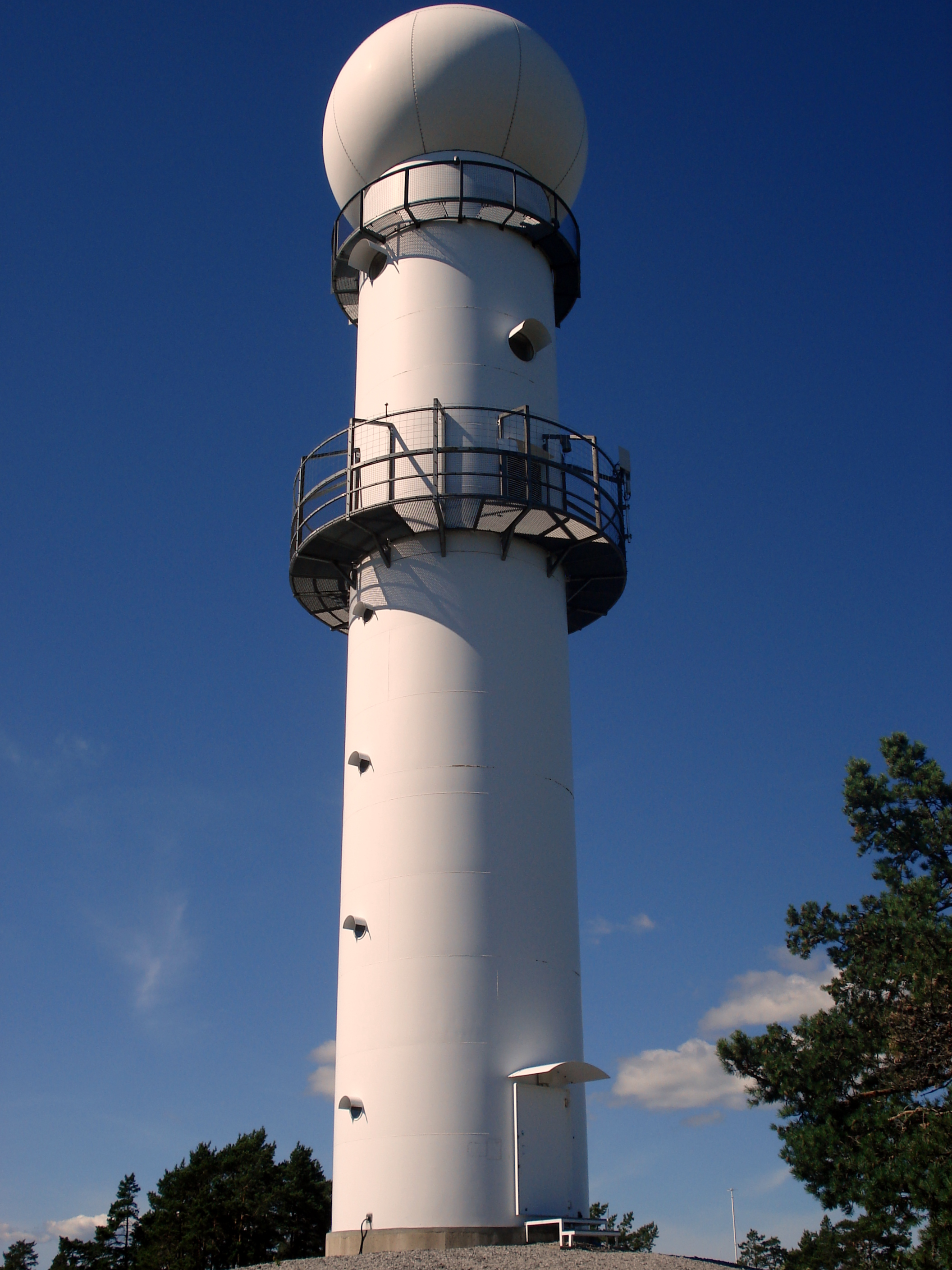
C-Band Doppler weather radar at Korpo, Pargas, Finland. Design, planning, maintenance and operation by Finnish Meteorological Institute.

== Services ==
FMI provides weather forecasts for aviation, traffic, shipping and media as well as private citizens via internet and mobile devices. It also has air quality services. For sea areas, it provides information about ice cover, sea level changes and waves.

In 2013 FMI made openly available data sets such as weather, sea and climate observation data, time series and model data. The open data is targeted to benefit application developers who want to develop new services, applications and products.

In 2009, researchers from VTT published a study assessing the benefits generated by the services offered by the Finnish Meteorological Institute. They concluded in sum in range of 260-290 million euros, while the annual budget of the institute was around 50 – 60 million Euros. This leads to estimate for annual benefit-cost ratio for the services to be at least 5:1.

== Observations ==
Finnish Meteorological Institute makes observations of the atmosphere, sea and space at over 400 stations around Finland. Its weather radar network consists of 10 C-band Doppler weather radars.

== Research ==
The research areas of FMI include meteorology, air quality, climate change, earth observation, marine and arctic research. Scientific research at FMI is mainly organized around three centers; "Weather, Sea and Climate Service Center", "Observing and Information Service Systems Center", "Space and Earth Observation Center", and two programs; "Meteorological and Marine Research Program", "Climate Research Program".

Every year FMI's researchers publish about 300 peer-reviewed articles.

The institute is an active member of the University of the Arctic. UArctic is an international cooperative network based in the Circumpolar Arctic region, consisting of more than 200 universities, colleges, and other organizations with an interest in promoting education and research in the Arctic region.

=== Air quality activities ===
The Finnish Meteorological Institute has investigated air quality processes and air pollution prevention techniques since the early 1970s. Their staff members have comprehensive competence within the areas of meteorology, physics, chemistry, biology and engineering. Integrated work is done in cooperation with many other European research institutes and universities.

The air quality activities conducted by the Institute include:

- Research, testing and development of air quality measuring methods and equipment.
- Development of air pollutant emission inventories.
- Development of air pollution dispersion models
- Performing chemical analyses of air quality.
- Study and development of air pollution prevention techniques.

The suite of local-scale (0 – 30 km) dispersion models available at the Institute includes:

- An urban area, multiple-source dispersion model.
- Vehicular pollution line-source dispersion models.
- Dispersion models for hazardous materials.
- Dispersion models for odorous compounds.

Dispersion models for larger scales (30 to 3000 km) are also available.

=== Space Research ===
The Finnish Meteorological Institute is one of the few places in Finland where space research takes place. The institute has been a part of several high-profile NASA and ESA missions, such as Phoenix, Mars Science Laboratory, Rosetta and BepiColombo, in addition to leading a lander mission of their own, MetNet. They worked with Spain and the United States to contribute to the Rover Environmental Monitoring Station (REMS) on Mars Science Laboratory (Curiosity).

The Finnish Meteorological Institute has designed and produced parts to the robotic space probe Rosetta and robotic lander Philae, which sent some data from comet 67P/Churyumov-Gerasimenko in 2014-2015.

The electric solar wind sail, invented 2006 by FMi scientist Pekka Janhunen, received the 2010 Finnish Quality Innovation Prize among Potential innovations. It was tested in ESTCube-1 satellite.

== Staff ==
The number of full-time staff of the Finnish Meteorological Institute is about 540. Permanent staff members account for about 2/3 of the Institute's personnel and those with contractual posts account for the remainder. The Institute operates in on a round-the-clock basis and about 30 percent of the full-time staff work in shifts.

54 percent of the staff have university degrees and 15 percent have a licentiate or PhD degree. The average age of the staff is 43 years.

== See also ==
- Climate change in Finland
- Foreca
- List of atmospheric dispersion models
- National Center for Atmospheric Research
- National Environmental Research Institute of Denmark
- NILU, the Norwegian Institute for Air Research
- Roadway air dispersion modeling
- SILAM
- Swedish Meteorological and Hydrological Institute
- TA Luft
- UK Atmospheric Dispersion Modelling Liaison Committee
- UK Dispersion Modelling Bureau
- University Corporation for Atmospheric Research
