= AUSTAL2000 =

Austal2000 is an atmospheric dispersion model for simulating the dispersion of air pollutants in the ambient atmosphere. It was developed by Ingenieurbüro Janicke in Dunum, Germany under contract to the Federal Ministry for Environment, Nature Conservation and Nuclear Safety.

Although not named in the TA Luft, it is the reference dispersion model accepted as being in compliance with the requirements of Annex 3 of the TA Luft and the pertinent VDI Guidelines.

== Description ==
It simulates the dispersion of air pollutants by utilizing a random walk process (Lagrangian simulation model) and it has capabilities for building effects, complex terrain, pollutant plume depletion by wet or dry deposition, and first order chemical reactions. It is available for download on the Internet free of cost.

Austal2000G is a similar model for simulating the dispersion of odours and it was also developed by Ingenieurbüro Janicke. The development of Austal 2000G was financed by three German states: Niedersachsen, Nordrhein-Westfalen and Baden-Württemberg.

== See also ==
- List of atmospheric dispersion models
- UK Dispersion Modelling Bureau
- UK Atmospheric Dispersion Modelling Liaison Committee
