= TA Luft =

German air pollution control regulation

Germany has an air pollution control regulation titled "Technical Instructions on Air Quality Control" (Technische Anleitung zur Reinhaltung der Luft) and commonly referred to as the TA Luft.

The first version of the TA Luft was established in 1964. It has subsequently been revised in 1974, 1983, 1988 and 2002. Parts of the TA Luft have been adopted by other countries as well.

In 1974, 10 years after the TA Luft was first established, the German government enacted the "Federal Pollution Control Act" (Bundes-Immissionsschutzgesetz). It also has subsequently been amended a number of times, the last of which was in 2002. Although the first version of the TA Luft existed 10 years before the enactment of the "Federal Pollution Control Act", it is often called the "First General Administrative Regulation" pertaining to the "Federal Pollution Control Act".

The German government created the Federal Ministry for Environment, Nature Conservation and Nuclear Safety (Bundesministerium für Umwelt, Naturschutz und Reaktorsicherheit) in June, 1986 and it is now responsible for implementing the TA Luft regulation under the "Federal Air Pollution Control Act".

== Overview ==
The TA Luft is a comprehensive air pollution control regulation that includes:

- A discussion of the scope of the TA Luft application, which is to review applications for licenses to construct and operate new industrial facilities (or altered existing facilities) and to determine whether the proposed new or altered facilities will comply with the requirements of the TA Luft and the requirements of other air pollutant emission regulations promulgated under the Federal Pollution Control Act.
- Air pollutant emission limits for dust, sulfur dioxide, nitrogen oxides, hydrofluoric acid and other gaseous inorganic fluorine compounds, arsenic and inorganic arsenic compounds, lead and inorganic lead compounds, cadmium and inorganic cadmium compounds, nickel and inorganic nickel compounds, mercury and inorganic mercury compounds, thallium and inorganic thallium compounds, ammonia from farming and livestock breeding operations, inorganic gases and particulates, organic substances and others.
- Emission limits may also be set for hazardous, toxic, carcinogenic or mutagenic substances as part of the TA Luft review procedures.
- Other limits or requirements related to stack heights (for flue gases or other process vents) and for storing, loading or working with liquid or solid substances.
- Various requirements for sampling measuring and monitoring emissions.
- Listing of the industries subject to the requirements of the TA Luft, such as mining, electric power generation, glass and ceramics, steel, aluminum and other metals, chemical plants, oil refining, plastics, food, and others.
- Annex 3 is devoted to guidelines on: how the atmospheric dispersion modeling required during the TA Luft review is to be performed, and the acceptable type of dispersion model to be used. In essence, the modeling must be in accordance with the VDI Guidelines 3782 Parts 1 and 2, 3783 Part 8, 3784 Part 2, and 3945 Part 3.

The full text of the TA Luft is available on the Internet.

== AUSTAL2000 ==
AUSTAL2000 is an atmospheric dispersion model for simulating the dispersion of air pollutants in the ambient atmosphere. It was developed by Ingenieurbüro Janicke in Dunum, Germany under contract to the Federal Ministry for Environment, Nature Conservation and Nuclear Safety. Although not named in the TA Luft, it is the reference dispersion model accepted as being in compliance with the requirements of Annex 3 of the TA Luft and the pertinent VDI Guidelines.

It simulates the dispersion of air pollutants by utilizing a random walk process (Lagrangian simulation model) and it has capabilities for building effects, complex terrain, pollutant plume depletion by wet or dry deposition, and first order chemical reactions. It is available for download on the Internet free of cost.

Austal2000G is a similar model for simulating the dispersion of odours and it was also developed by Ingenieurbüro Janicke. The development of Austal 2000G was financed by three German states: Niedersachsen, Nordrhein-Westfalen and Baden-Württemberg.

== See also ==
- 2008/50/EG
- Air Quality Modeling Group
- Air Resources Laboratory
- AP 42 Compilation of Air Pollutant Emission Factors
- Bibliography of atmospheric dispersion modeling
- List of atmospheric dispersion models
- UK Atmospheric Dispersion Modelling Liaison Committee
- UK Dispersion Modelling Bureau
