= Norwegian Institute for Air Research =

Norwegian foundation

NILU
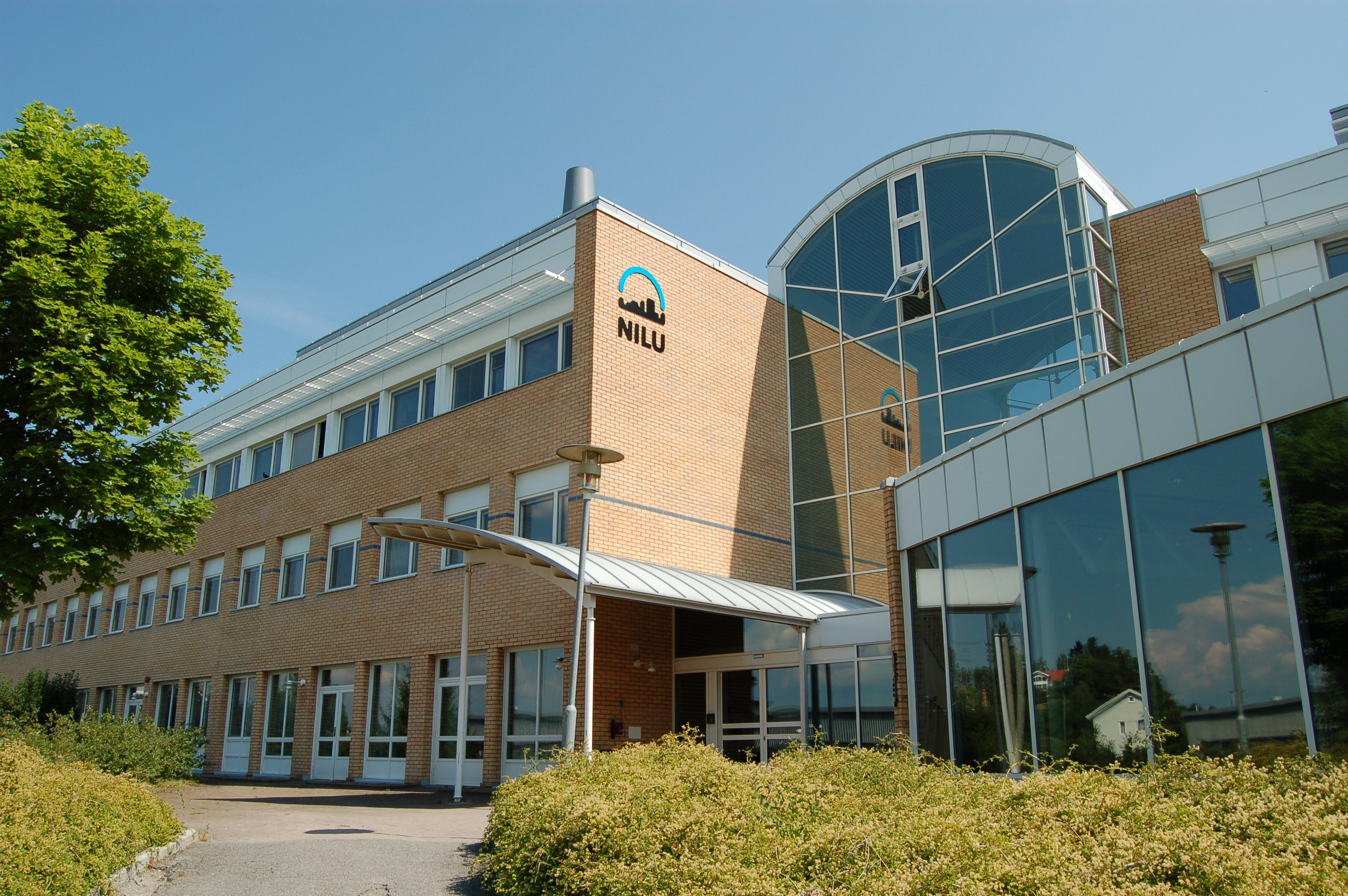
- NILU at Kjeller on the outskirt of Oslo, Norway.
- Established: 1969
- Mission: Air pollution
- CEO: Tomas Eric Nordlander
- Members: 200
- Formerly called: NILU – Norwegian Institute for Air Research
- Address: Instituttveien 18, 2007 Kjeller
- Location: Kjeller, Norway
- Coordinates: 59°58′31″N 11°3′12″E
- Interactive map of NILU
- Website: www.nilu.com

The climate and environmental research institute NILU is one of the leading specialized scientific laboratories in Europe researching issues related to air pollution, climate change and health. It is an independent nonprofit institution, established in 1969, staffed by scientists, engineers and technicians with specialized expertise for working on air pollution problems. The staff do more than two hundred projects annually for research councils, industries, international banks and local, national and international authorities and organizations. Its first director was Brynjulf Ottar.

== Fields of work ==
NILU was founded in 1969 and the institute conducts environmental research with emphasis on the sources of air pollution and on air pollution dispersion, transport, transformation and deposition. It is also involved in the assessment of the effects of pollution on ecosystems, human health and materials. Integrated environmental assessments and optimal abatement strategy planning has been a field of priority during the last few years. Assessment of transboundary transport of air pollutants, acid rain and global air quality are important tasks.

NILU has the responsibility as a national research institution for air pollution in Norway and is also being used as an international air pollution expert by the World Bank, the Asian Development Bank, the World Health Organization and the World Meteorological Organization. NILU hosts the World Data Centre for Aerosols (WDCA) and the World Data Centre for Reactive Gases (WDCRG).

NILU has developed an automatic surveillance program for air quality in cities and background areas. NILU have specialized in computerized automatic air pollution surveillance, planning and optimal abatement strategy planning. This AirQUIS system is an air pollution management and planning system designed for managers and decision-makers.

== Companies and locations ==
NILU's head office is at Kjeller on the outskirt of Oslo in Norway. A specialized office for Arctic related matters is an integrated part of the Fram Centre (FRAM – High North Research Centre for Climate and the Environment) in Tromsø. Innovation nilu is a holding company for NILU's various commercial interests and subsidiaries.

== See also ==
- Atmospheric dispersion modeling
- List of atmospheric dispersion models
- Czech Hydrometeorological Institute
- Finnish Meteorological Institute
- National Center for Atmospheric Research
- National Environmental Research Institute of Denmark
- Roadway air dispersion modeling
- Swedish Meteorological and Hydrological Institute
- TA Luft
- UK Atmospheric Dispersion Modelling Liaison Committee
- UK Dispersion Modelling Bureau
- University Corporation for Atmospheric Research
