= OSPM =

OSPM may refer to:

- Operating System-directed configuration and Power Management, a computer specification for device configuration and power management by the operating system
- Operational Street Pollution Model, an atmospheric dispersion model
