= ATSTEP =

Mathematical model for nuclear emergency management

ATSTEP is a Gaussian puff model for diagnosis and prognosis of the atmospheric dispersion, deposition, gamma radiation and doses of released radioactivity in case of accidents in nuclear power plants or during transport, and from dirty bombs.

It was developed by Forschungszentrum Karlsruhe (now Karlsruhe Institute of Technology, KIT), one of the largest national research centers in Germany, and is designed for running in the RODOS (Real-time On-line DecisiOn Support) system for nuclear emergency management. RODOS is operational at the German Federal Office for Radiation Protection (BfS), and test operational in many other European countries.

== See also ==
- Bibliography of atmospheric dispersion modeling
- Air pollution dispersion terminology
- Atmospheric dispersion modeling
- List of atmospheric dispersion models
