= RIMPUFF =

RIMPUFF is a local-scale puff diffusion model developed by Risø DTU National Laboratory for Sustainable Energy, Denmark. It is an emergency response model to help emergency management organisations deal with chemical, biological and radiological releases to the atmosphere.

RIMPUFF is in operational use in several European national emergency centres for preparedness and prediction of nuclear accidental releases (RODOS, EURANOS, ARGOS), chemical gas releases (ARGOS), and for airborne Foot-and Mouth Disease virus spread.

== Description ==
RIMPUFF builds from parameterized formulas for puff diffusion, wet and dry deposition, and gamma dose radiation. Its range of application covers distances up to ~1000 km from the point of release.

RIMPUFF calculates the instantaneous atmospheric dispersion taking into account the local wind variability and the local turbulence levels. The puff sizes represent instantaneous relative diffusion (no averaging) and is calculated from similarity scaling theory. Puff diffusion is parameterized for travel times in the range from a few seconds and up to ~1 day.

Wet and dry deposition is also calculated as a function of local rain intensity and turbulence levels.

== See also ==
- List of atmospheric dispersion models
- UK Atmospheric Dispersion Modelling Liaison Committee
- UK Dispersion Modelling Bureau
