= Silam =

Silam or SILAM may refer to:

== Malaysia ==
- Silam, an area of Sabah
- Mount Silam
- Lahad Datu (federal constituency), former name Silam
- Silam (federal constituency)
- Silam (state constituency)

== Other uses ==
- S. L. Silam, (born 1896), Lt. Governor of Puducherry Union Territory, India
- SILAM (System for Integrated Modeling of Atmospheric Composition), an atmospheric dispersion model
