= PUFF-PLUME =

PUFF-PLUME is a model used to help predict how air pollution disperses in the atmosphere. It is a Gaussian atmospheric transport chemical/radionuclide dispersion model that includes wet and dry deposition, real-time input of meteorological observations and forecasts, dose estimates from inhalation and gamma shine (i.e., radiation), and puff or continuous plume dispersion modes. It was first developed by the Pacific Northwest National Laboratory (PNNL) in the 1970s.

It is the primary model for emergency response use for atmospheric releases at the Savannah River Site of the United States Department of Energy. It is one of a suite of codes for atmospheric releases and is used primarily for first-cut results in emergency situations. (Other codes containing more detailed mathematical and physical models are available for use when a short response time is not the over-riding consideration.)

== See also ==
- Bibliography of atmospheric dispersion modeling
- Atmospheric dispersion modeling
- List of atmospheric dispersion models
