= Air Quality Modeling Group =

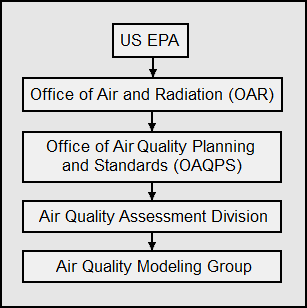
Where the AQMG fits into the US EPA

The Air Quality Modeling Group (AQMG) is in the U.S. EPA's Office of Air and Radiation (OAR) and provides leadership and direction on the full range of air quality models, air pollution dispersion models and other mathematical simulation techniques used in assessing pollution control strategies and the impacts of air pollution sources.

The AQMG serves as the focal point on air pollution modeling techniques for other EPA headquarters staff, EPA regional Offices, and State and local environmental agencies. It coordinates with the EPA's Office of Research and Development (ORD) on the development of new models and techniques, as well as wider issues of atmospheric research. Finally, the AQMG conducts modeling analyses to support the policy and regulatory decisions of the EPA's Office of Air Quality Planning and Standards (OAQPS).

The AQMG is located in Research Triangle Park, North Carolina.

== Projects maintained by the AQMG ==
The AQMG maintains the following specific projects:

- Air Quality Analyses to Support Modeling
- Air Quality Modeling Guidelines
- Dispersion Modeling Computer Codes
- Dispersion Modeling
- Emissions Inventories For Regional Modeling
- Guidance on Modeling for New NAAQS & Regional Haze
- Meteorological Data Guidance and Modeling
- Model Clearinghouse
- Models-3/Community Multiscale Air Quality (CMAQ)
- Models3 Applications Team, Outreach and Training Coordination
- Multimedia Modeling
- PM Data Analysis and PM Modeling
- Preferred/Recommended Models Alternative Models Screening Models
- Regional Ozone Modeling
- Roadway Intersection Modeling
- Support Center For Regulatory Air Models (SCRAM)
- Urban Ozone Modeling
- Visibility and Regional Haze Modeling

== See also ==
- Accidental release source terms
- Bibliography of atmospheric dispersion modeling
- Air Quality Modelling and Assessment Unit (AQMAU)
- Air Resources Laboratory
- AP 42 Compilation of Air Pollutant Emission Factors
- Atmospheric dispersion modeling
- Atmospheric Studies Group
- Category:Atmospheric dispersion modeling
- List of atmospheric dispersion models
- Met Office
- UK Atmospheric Dispersion Modelling Liaison Committee
- UK Dispersion Modelling Bureau
