= National Environmental Research Institute of Denmark =

Danish research institute

- Danmarks Miljøundersøgelser

Research Institute overview
- Formed: 1989
- Dissolved: 1 July 2011
- Parent department: Ministry of Environment
- Child Research Institute: Greenland Biological Research laboratory

The National Environmental Research Institute of Denmark, abbreviated NERI, (Danish: Danmarks Miljøundersøgelser, abbreviated DMU) was an independent research institute under the Ministry of the Environment. It was created in 1989 by merging the existing laboratories of the Environmental Protection Agency, which covered marine, freshwater and air pollution, soil ecology and analytical chemistry, with the Danish Wildlife Research, under the Ministry of Agriculture. The laboratories were physically located on Risø, in Silkeborg and on Kalø, north of Aarhus. In 1995, Greenland Biological Research laboratory was added.

The research institute was detached from the ministry in 2007 and merged into Aarhus University as a separate unit with largely unchanged tasks and responsibilities. On 1 July 2011, it was reorganized, renamed and lost status as a separate entity. The research departments were divided between the Department of Bioscience and the Department of Environmental Science, while the secretariat and coordination of consultancy services to the Ministry of Environment was placed in the Danish Centre for Environment and Energy (abbreviated DCE).

The institute participated in a large number of national and international research programmes, and also in scientific working groups, commissions, and organizations under such bodies as the European Union and the United Nations. It also undertook scientific consultancy work and monitoring of nature and the environment as well as applied and strategic research. Its primary task was to establish a scientific foundation for environmental policy decisions. All tasks were transferred to and continue in the Danish Centre for Environment and Energy and the two research departments.

== Departments ==
By its reorganisation in 2011, the National Environmental Research Institute of Denmark was organised in the following research departments:

- Department of Policy Analysis
- Department of Atmospheric Environment
- Department of Environmental Chemistry and Microbiology
- Department of Marine Ecology
- Department of Arctic Environment
- Department of Terrestrial Ecology
- Department of Freshwater Ecology
- Department of Ecology and Biodiversity

During the reorganisation, the first three groups formed the Department of Environmental Sciences and the latter five the Department of Bioscience.

== Department of Atmospheric Environment ==
The department monitors air pollution in Denmark and Greenland, and works with mathematical atmospheric dispersion models to describe transport, transformation and deposition of air pollutants. The models range in spatial resolution from local air pollution in a single street, to both nationwide and global air pollution. The department also compiles Danish emission inventories as part of Denmark's obligations in accordance with international conventions, and participates in many international collaboration networks within the field of air pollution, and it hosts websites for several such networks.

The Department of Atmospheric Environment has a staff of over 65 scientists and researchers who conduct work within the following fields:

- Monitoring and mapping of the air quality in Denmark and the Arctic.
- Research, development and application of atmospheric chemical dispersion models.
- Studying air pollution scenarios and prognoses as well as air pollution from vehicular traffic.
- Studies, analyses, and models for the transport, transformation, and fate of toxic air pollutants.

== See also ==
- Air pollution dispersion terminology
- Atmospheric dispersion modeling
- List of atmospheric dispersion models
- Czech Hydrometeorological Institute
- Finnish Meteorological Institute
- National Center for Atmospheric Research
- NILU, the Norwegian Institute for Air Research
- Roadway air dispersion modeling
- Swedish Meteorological and Hydrological Institute
- TA Luft
- UK Atmospheric Dispersion Modelling Liaison Committee
- UK Dispersion Modelling Bureau
- University Corporation for Atmospheric Research
