= MERCURE =

Atmospheric dispersion modeling CFD

MERCURE is an atmospheric dispersion modeling CFD code developed by Électricité de France (EDF) and distributed by ARIA Technologies, a French company.

MERCURE is a version of the CFD software ESTET, developed by EDF's Laboratoire National d'Hydraulique. Thus, it has directly benefited from the improvements developed for ESTET. When requested, ARIA integrates MERCURE as a module into the ARIA RISK software for use in industrial risk assessments.

== Features of the model ==
MERCURE is particularly well adapted to perform air pollution dispersion modelling on local or urban scales. Some of the models capabilities and features are:

- Pollution source types: Point or line sources, continuous or intermittent.
- Pollution plume types: Buoyant or dense gas plumes.
- Deposition: The model is capable of simulating the deposition or decay of plume pollutants.

== Users of the model ==
There are many organizations that have used MERCURE. To name a few:

- Électricité de France (EDF)
- Laboratoire de Mécanique des Fluides et d’Acoustique (LMFA) de l'École Centrale de Lyon, France
- Institut de radioprotection et de sûreté nucléaire (IRSN), Fontenay, France
- The Italian National Agency for New Technology, Energy and the Environment (ENEA), Bologna, Italy
- Queensland University of Technology, Brisbane, Australia

== See also ==
- Bibliography of atmospheric dispersion modeling
- Atmospheric dispersion modeling
- List of atmospheric dispersion models
