= Operational Street Pollution Model =

Atmospheric dispersion model

The Operational Street Pollution Model (OSPM) is an atmospheric dispersion model for simulating the dispersion of air pollutants in so-called street canyons. It was developed by the National Environmental Research Institute of Denmark, Department of Atmospheric Environment, Aarhus University. As a result of reorganisation at Aarhus University the model has been maintained by the Department of Environmental Science at Aarhus University since 2011. For about 20 years, OSPM has been used in many countries for studying traffic pollution, performing analyses of field campaign measurements, studying efficiency of pollution abatement strategies, carrying out exposure assessments and as reference in comparisons to other models. OSPM is generally considered as state-of-the-art in practical street pollution modelling.

== Description ==
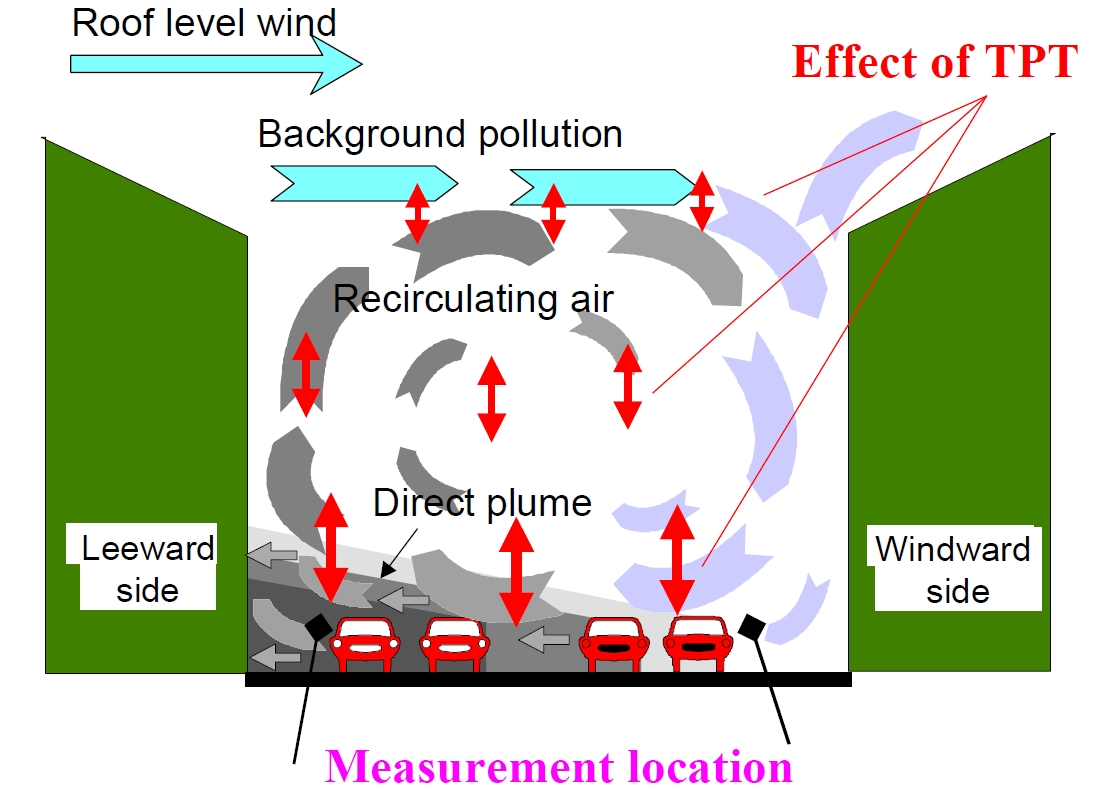
Figure 1: Principal flow pattern inside a street canyon for near perpendicular roof level wind direction and schematic picture of the main processes assumed in OSPM.

In OSPM concentrations of traffic-emitted pollution is calculated using a combination of a plume model for the direct contribution and a box model for the recirculating part of the pollutants in the street.

The NO_{2} concentrations are calculated taking into account NO-NO_{2}-O_{3} chemistry and the residence time of pollutants in the street. The model is designed to work with input and output in the form of one-hour averages.

The main principles in the model are depicted in Figure 1 for the case of a wind direction nearly perpendicular to the street canyon. A receptor point in leeward position is affected by the direct plume showing considerably higher concentrations than a receptor in windward position being exposed to the less concentrated recirculating air.

The turbulence produced by the moving traffic (TPT) is acting in addition to the turbulence created by the roof level wind. This leads to a faster dispersion of the direct plume but also to an improved air exchange at roof level between the street canyon and the background air.

== See also ==
- List of atmospheric dispersion models
