= SILAM =

Meteorological model

SILAM (System for Integrated Modeling of Atmospheric Composition) is a global-to-meso-scale atmospheric dispersion model developed by the Finnish Meteorological Institute (FMI).

== Model ==
It provides information on atmospheric composition, air quality, and wildfire smoke (PM_{2.5}) and is also able to solve the inverse dispersion problem. It can take data from a variety of sources, including natural ones such as sea salt, blown dust, and pollen.

The FMI provides three datasets based on SILAM: a 4-day global air pollutant (SO_{2}, NO, NO_{2}, O_{3}, PM_{2.5}, and PM_{10}) forecast based on TNO-MACC (global emission) and IS4FIRES (wildfire), a 5-day global wildfire smoke forecast based on IS4FIRES, and a 5-day pollen forecast for Europe.
