= DISPERSION21 =

DISPERSION21 (also called DISPERSION 2.1) is a local scale atmospheric pollution dispersion model developed by the air quality research unit at Swedish Meteorological and Hydrological Institute (SMHI), located in Norrköping.

The model is widely used in Sweden by local and regional environmental agencies, various industrial users, consultant services offered by SMHI and for educational purposes.

== Features and Capabilities ==
Some of the basic features and capabilities of DISPLAY21 are:

- Source types: Multiple point, area, and volume sources as well as street canyons.
- Source releases: Surface, near surface and elevated sources.
- Source locations: Urban or rural locations.
- Plume types: Continuous or intermittent buoyant plumes
- Plume dispersion treatment: Gaussian model treatment using Green's functions and includes multiple reflections.
- Terrain types: Simple terrain with no more than 10 degree slopes.
- Building effects: Building downwash algorithms are included.
- Meteorological data: The model includes a preprocessor to produce the meteorological parameters needed to characterize the atmospheric turbulence as well as to produce wind speed and direction profiles.
- The street canyon module includes some atmospheric chemistry for photochemical reactions.

== See also ==
- Bibliography of atmospheric dispersion modeling
- Atmospheric dispersion modeling
- List of atmospheric dispersion models
- Swedish Meteorological and Hydrological Institute
