= Foreca =

Finnish private weather forecasting company

Foreca Ltd
- Native name: Foreca Oy
- Company type: Subsidiary
- Genre: Weather forecasting
- Founded: 1996; 30 years ago
- Headquarters: Espoo, Finland
- Website: www.foreca.com

Foreca Ltd (/ˈfɔːrkə/) is a private Finnish weather forecasting company. It is the largest of its kind in the Nordic countries and is headquartered in Espoo, Finland. Foreca provides weather services for international business use. This service is partly based on data and products of the European Centre for Medium-Range Weather Forecasts.

Foreca was first established in 1996 under the name Weather Service Finland. In January 2001, it changed its name to Foreca as part of its efforts to expand the company internationally.

Foreca provides weather and road weather services to the automotive, digital media, and winter road maintenance industries. Since 2004, the company has had a contract with Microsoft to produce content for its international MSN websites and Microsoft Windows. Foreca provides weather services for drivers that are customers of companies such as BMW, Daimler, and TomTom.

== See also ==
- Finnish Meteorological Institute
