= CALPUFF =

Modeling system for simulatating atmospheric pollution dispersion

CALPUFF is an advanced, integrated Lagrangian puff modeling system for the simulation of atmospheric pollution dispersion distributed by the Atmospheric Studies Group at TRC Solutions.

It is maintained by the model developers and distributed by TRC. The model has been adopted by the United States Environmental Protection Agency (EPA) in its Guideline on Air Quality Models as a preferred model for assessing long range transport of pollutants and their impacts on Federal Class I areas and on a case-by-case basis for certain near-field applications involving complex meteorological conditions.

The integrated modeling system consists of three main components and a set of preprocessing and postprocessing programs. The main components of the modeling system are CALMET (a diagnostic 3-dimensional meteorological model), CALPUFF (an air quality dispersion model), and CALPOST (a postprocessing package). Each of these programs has a graphical user interface (GUI). In addition to these components, there are numerous other processors that may be used to prepare geophysical (land use and terrain) data in many standard formats, meteorological data (surface, upper air, precipitation, and buoy data), and interfaces to other models such as the Penn State/NCAR Mesoscale Model (MM5), the National Centers for Environmental Prediction (NCEP) Eta model and the RAMS meteorological model.

The CALPUFF model is designed to simulate the dispersion of buoyant, puff or continuous point and area pollution sources as well as the dispersion of buoyant, continuous line sources. The model also includes algorithms for handling the effect of downwash by nearby buildings in the path of the pollution plumes.

== History ==
The CALPUFF model was originally developed by the Sigma Research Corporation (SRC) in the late 1980s under contract with the California Air Resources Board (CARB) and it was first issued in about 1990.

The Sigma Research Corporation subsequently became part of Earth Tech, Inc. After the US EPA designated CALPUFF as a preferred model in their Guideline on Air Quality Models, Earth Tech served as the designated distributor of the model.

In April 2006, ownership of the model switched from Earth Tech to the TRC Environmental Corporation. Circa 2009 the domain www.calpuff.org was set up under Breeze Software. More recently ownership transferred to E^{x}ponent, who were (circa December 2015) responsible for maintaining and distributing the model. By 2024, www.calpuff.org was run by Lakes Software.

== See also ==
- Air pollution dispersion terminology
- Atmospheric dispersion modeling
- List of atmospheric dispersion models
