= ISC3 =

Gaussian plume model

ISC3 (Industrial Source Complex) model is a popular steady-state Gaussian plume model which can be used to assess pollutant concentrations from a wide variety of sources associated with an industrial complex.

This model can account for the following:

- Point, area, line, and volume sources
- Settling and dry deposition of particles
- Downwash
- Separation of point sources
- Limited terrain adjustment

ISC3 operates in both long-term and short-term modes. The screening version of ISC3 is SCREEN3.

Very recently, the status of ISC3 as a Preferred/Recommended Model of the US Environmental Protection Agency has been withdrawn, but it can still be used as an alternative to the Preferred/Recommended models in regulatory applications with case-by-case justification to the reviewing authority.

== Input data ==
ISC short term version required two sets of data: source data and hourly averaged meteorological data:

=== Source data ===
- Dimensions of the source
- Emission discharge rate
- Release height of the emission source

=== Meteorological data ===
- Ambient temperature, K
- Wind direction
- Wind speed, m/s
- Atmospheric stability classes (A through F, entered as 1 through 6)
- Urban and rural mixing height, m

== See also ==
- Bibliography of atmospheric dispersion modeling
- Atmospheric dispersion modeling
- List of atmospheric dispersion models
