= NAME (dispersion model) =

NAME atmospheric pollution dispersion model was first developed by the UK's Met Office in 1986 after the nuclear accident at Chernobyl, which demonstrated the need for a method that could predict the spread and deposition of radioactive gases or material released into the atmosphere.

The acronym "NAME" originally stood for "Nuclear Accident ModEl". The Met Office has revised and upgraded the model over the years and it is now used as a general purpose dispersion model. The current version is known as the NAME III (Numerical Atmospheric-dispersion Modelling Environment) model. NAME III is currently operational, and was expected to completely replace the original NAME model sometime in 2006.

== Features and capabilities ==
NAME (in its current NAME III version) is a Lagrangian air pollution dispersion model for short range to global range scales. It employs 3-dimensional meteorological data provided by the Met Office's Unified National Weather Prediction Model. Random walk techniques using empirical turbulence profiles are utilized to represent turbulent mixing. In essence, NAME follows the 3-dimensional trajectories of parcels of the pollution plume and computes pollutant concentrations by Monte Carlo methods — that is, by direct simulation rather than solving equations.

NAME uses a puff technique when modelling dispersion over a short range which shortens the time needed to compute the pollutant concentrations at the receptors.

The model has the capability to calculate: the rise of buoyant plumes; deposition of pollution plume components due to rainfall (i.e., wet deposition); dry deposition; plume chemistry focusing on sulphate and nitrate chemistry; plume depletion via the decay of radioactive materials; the downwash effects of buildings.

The model can also be run 'backwards' to generate maps that locate possible plume originating sources.

== The Met Office's commitments to emergency response service ==
The Met Office has international commitments to provide emergency response dispersion modelling services for releases of hazardous gases and materials into the atmosphere. Such events include the release of radioactive materials and emissions from erupting volcanoes. Those commitments are met by an operational group known as EMARC who are supported by a Met Office team of dispersion modelling staff. That team is also responsible for the scientific development of NAME III which, combined with the Met Office numerical weather prediction model, is used to provide the dispersion modelling services needed to implement the listed commitments:

- The WMO (World Meteorological Office) has designated the Met Office to operate one of the worldwide RSMCs (Regional Specialist Meteorological Centre).
- The Met Office has also been designated a VAAC (Volcanic Ash Advisory Centre), which is part of the IAVW (International Airways Volcano Watch) set up by the ICAO (International Civil Aviation Organization).

Over the years, NAME has been applied to radioactive releases, the Kuwaiti oil fires, major industrial fires and chemical spills, and two volcanic eruptions in Iceland.

== See also ==
- Bibliography of atmospheric dispersion modeling
- Atmospheric dispersion modeling
- List of atmospheric dispersion models
- UK Dispersion Modelling Bureau
