= Air Resources Laboratory =

- Abbreviation: ARL
- Type: Governmental
- Headquarters: College Park, Maryland
- Director: Dr. Ariel Stein
- Deputy Director: Dr. LaToya Myles
- Parent organization: Office of Oceanic and Atmospheric Research
- Website: https://www.arl.noaa.gov/

The Air Resources Laboratory (ARL) is an applied research laboratory in the Office of Oceanic and Atmospheric Research (OAR) which is an operating unit within the National Oceanic and Atmospheric Administration (NOAA) in the United States. It is one of ten NOAA Research Laboratories (RLs). In October 2005, the Surface Radiation Research Branch of the ARL was merged with five other NOAA labs to form the Earth System Research Laboratories.

The ARL studies processes and develops models relating to weather, emergency management, climate and air quality, including the transport, dispersion, transformation and removal of pollutants from the ambient atmosphere. The emphasis of the ARL's work is on data interpretation, technology development and transfer. The specific goal of ARL research is to improve and eventually to institutionalize prediction of trends, dispersion of air pollutant plumes, air quality, atmospheric deposition, and related variables.

ARL provides scientific and technical advice to elements of NOAA and other Government agencies on atmospheric science, environmental problems, emergency assistance (Homeland Security), and climate change.

ARL's stated goal is to improve the Nation's ability to protect human and ecosystem health while also maintaining a vibrant economy.

== Organization ==
ARL's headquarters is located in College Park, Maryland (formerly in Silver Spring, Maryland) and the current Director is Dr. Ariel Stein.

The headquarters group develops products to augment the operational product suites of the NOAA service-oriented line offices (particularly the National Weather Service). This includes the research and development of improved dispersion models for emergency response and air quality forecast models. The headquarters group also improves the understanding of climate variability and trends, the exchange of pollutants between the air and land, and the sources of mercury that influence sensitive ecosystems.

As depicted in the adjacent organization diagram, the ARL operates with four research divisions in Idaho Falls, Idaho; North Las Vegas, Nevada; Oak Ridge, Tennessee; and Research Triangle Park, North Carolina:

- The Atmospheric Turbulence & Diffusion Division (ATDD) is located in Oak Ridge, Tennessee. ATDD concentrates on air quality and climate-related research directed toward issues of national and global importance. In their air quality research, ATDD develops better methods for predicting transport, dispersion, and air-surface exchange of air pollutants; applies these methods to increasingly realistic situations including nighttime cases, complex terrain, and non-uniform surfaces; and tests these methods against data to determine the confidence limits and uncertainties which apply. ATDD's climate-related research includes reference-grade measurement of climate change and related physical and chemical processes.
- The Field Research Division (FRD) is located in Idaho Falls, Idaho. FRD conducts experiments to better understand atmospheric transport and dispersion, improves both the theory and models of air-surface exchange processes, and develops new technologies and instrumentation to carry out its mission. In a cooperative agreement with the Department of Energy, the Division supports the Idaho National Laboratory with meteorological forecasts and emergency response capabilities.
- The Special Operations & Research Division (SORD) is located in Las Vegas, Nevada. SORD conducts basic and applied research in atmospheric dispersion, particle re-suspension, particle deposition, and the effects of airborne particles on atmospheric opacity. The Division supports issues of mutual interest to NOAA and the Department of Energy that relate to the Nevada Test Site, its atmospheric environment, and its emergency preparedness and emergency response activities.
- The Atmospheric Sciences Modeling Division (ASMD) develops and evaluates predictive atmospheric models on all spatial and temporal scales for forecasting air quality and for assessing changes in air quality and air pollutant exposures. It was established in 1955 to collaborate with the Environmental Protection Agency (EPA) and its predecessor agencies in developing advanced air quality models. The ASMD is currently located in College Park, Maryland (formerly in Research Triangle Park, North Carolina).

== See also ==
- Accidental release source terms
- Air Quality Modeling Group
- AP 42 Compilation of Air Pollutant Emission Factors
- Atmospheric dispersion modeling
- Met Office
- UK Atmospheric Dispersion Modelling Liaison Committee
- UK Dispersion Modelling Bureau
