= Preprocessor (CAE) =

In computer aided engineering (CAE) a preprocessor is a program which provides a graphical user interface (GUI) to define boundary conditions, materials, other physical properties and simulation control settings. This data is used by the subsequent computer simulation.

Steps that are followed in Pre-Processing

1> The geometry (physical bounds) of the problem is defined

2> The volume occupied by the fluid is divided into discrete cells (meshing)

3> The physical modeling is defined - E.g. equations of motion + enthalpy + radiation + species conservation

4> Boundary conditions are defined. This involves specifying the fluid behavior and properties at the boundaries of the problem. For transient problems, the initial conditions are also defined.

5> The simulation is started and the equations are solved iteratively as a steady state or transient

6> Finally a post-processor is used for the analysis and visualization of the resting solution
