= Atmospheric Dispersion Modelling Liaison Committee =

The Atmospheric Dispersion Modelling Liaison Committee (ADMLC) is composed of representatives from government departments, agencies (predominantly but not exclusively from the UK) and private consultancies. The ADMLC's main aim is to review current understanding of atmospheric dispersion and related phenomena for application primarily in the authorization or licensing of pollutant emissions to the atmosphere from industrial, commercial or institutional sites.

The ADMLC is primarily concerned with atmospheric pollutant discharges from regulated emission sites and other fixed sources. Their review and study interests include routine discharges as well as accidental releases or releases cause by operational upsets. Their interests also include modelling dispersion at all scales from on-site short range (including dispersion modelling indoors) to long range distances. The ADMLC does not normally get involved with pollutant emissions from roadway traffic or other non-fixed sources. Nor does it get involved with air pollution topics such as acid rain and ozone formation.

== History ==
In 1977, a meeting of representatives from UK government departments, utilities and research organisations was held to discuss atmospheric dispersion calculation methods for radioactive releases. Those present agreed on the need for a review of recent developments in atmospheric dispersion modelling and formed an informal Steering Committee, which operated for a number of years. That Steering Committee subsequently became the Atmospheric Dispersion Modelling Liaison Committee in 1995.

Although the ADMLC was initially formed to consider primarily radioactive releases from the nuclear industry, it has expanded its range of interests and its membership to more fully reflect the needs of industrial and regulatory organisations.

== Membership ==
As listed on the ADMLC's web site, the membership of the ADMLC includes the following entities:

- Atomic Weapons Establishment at Aldermaston
- Defence Science and Technology Laboratory (DSTL)
- Department for Energy and Climate Change
- Department for Environment Food and Rural Affairs (Defra)
- Environment Agency
- Environmental Protection Agency (Ireland)
- Food Standards Agency
- Health and Safety Executive
  - Methodology and Standards Development Unit, Hazardous Installations Directorate
  - Nuclear Installations Inspectorate
- Health and Safety Laboratory
- Home Office
- Met Office
- Amec Foster Wheeler
- Nuclear Department, HMS Sultan
- Public Health England
- Scottish Environment Protection Agency

The Chairman of ADMLC is provided by the Met Office and the Secretariat of the ADMLC are provided by Public Health England.

== Areas of interest ==
ADMLC facilitates the exchange of ideas and highlights where there are gaps in knowledge. It tries to provide guidance to, and to endorse good practice in, the dispersion modelling community. The ADMLC has hosted workshops and welcomes ideas for joint meetings or joint workshops with other organisations.

The ADMLC members pay an annual subscription which is used to fund reviews on topics agreed on by the members. Reviews already funded by ADMLC include:

- Dispersion at low wind speed
- Dispersion from sources near groups of buildings, or in urban areas
- Plume rise
- Dispersion in coastal areas,
- The use of old meteorological data or data obtained at some distance from the release point
- The possible use of data from numerical weather prediction programs
- Uncertainty of dispersion model predictions as a result of deriving atmospheric stability indicators from meteorological data
- Proceedings of a workshop on the reliability of dispersion models for regulatory applications
- Review of the Royal Meteorological Society guidelines for atmospheric dispersion modelling
- Calculation of air pollutant concentrations indoors
- Dispersion following explosions

A complete list of projects, and links to each report, can be found on the ADMLC website.

== See also ==
- Accidental release source terms
- Bibliography of atmospheric dispersion modeling
- Air pollution dispersion terminology
- Air Quality Modeling Group
- Air Quality Modelling and Assessment Unit (AQMAU)
- Air Resources Laboratory
- AP 42 Compilation of Air Pollutant Emission Factors
- Atmospheric dispersion modeling
- Category:Atmospheric dispersion modeling
- List of atmospheric dispersion models
- Finnish Meteorological Institute
- Met Office
- National Environmental Research Institute of Denmark
- NILU, Norwegian Institute of Air Research
- Royal Meteorological Society
- UK Dispersion Modelling Bureau
