= List of atmospheric dispersion models =

Atmospheric dispersion models are computer programs that use mathematical algorithms to simulate how pollutants in the ambient atmosphere disperse and, in some cases, how they react in the atmosphere.

== US Environmental Protection Agency models ==
Many of the dispersion models developed by or accepted for use by the U.S. Environmental Protection Agency (U.S. EPA) are accepted for use in many other countries as well. Those EPA models are grouped below into four categories.

=== Preferred and recommended models ===
- AERMOD – An atmospheric dispersion model based on atmospheric boundary layer turbulence structure and scaling concepts, including treatment of multiple ground-level and elevated point, area and volume sources. It handles flat or complex, rural or urban terrain and includes algorithms for building effects and plume penetration of inversions aloft. It uses Gaussian dispersion for stable atmospheric conditions (i.e., low turbulence) and non-Gaussian dispersion for unstable conditions (high turbulence). Algorithms for plume depletion by wet and dry deposition are also included in the model. This model was in development for approximately 14 years before being officially accepted by the U.S. EPA.

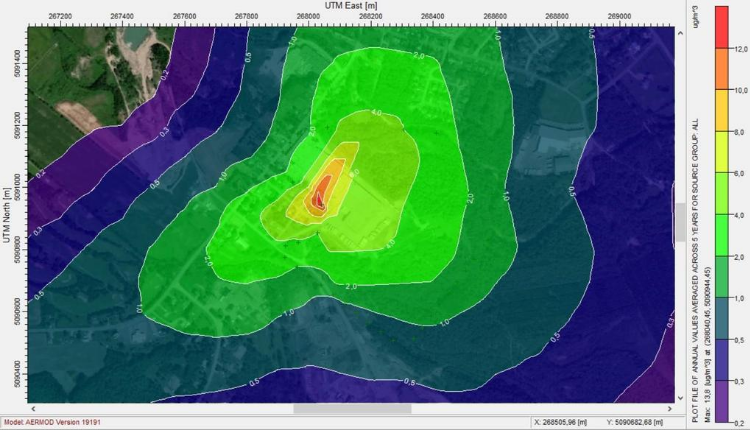
Result of an atmospheric dispersion simulation using AERMOD

- CALPUFF – A non-steady-state puff dispersion model that simulates the effects of time- and space-varying meteorological conditions on pollution transport, transformation, and removal. CALPUFF can be applied for long-range transport and for complex terrain.
- BLP – A Gaussian plume dispersion model designed to handle unique modelling problems associated with industrial sources where plume rise and downwash effects from stationary line sources are important.
- CALINE3 – A steady-state Gaussian dispersion model designed to determine pollution concentrations at receptor locations downwind of highways located in relatively uncomplicated terrain.
- CAL3QHC and CAL3QHCR – CAL3QHC is a CALINE3 based model with queuing calculations and a traffic model to calculate delays and queues that occur at signalized intersections. CAL3QHCR is a more refined version based on CAL3QHC that requires local meteorological data.
- CTDMPLUS – A complex terrain dispersion model (CTDM) plus algorithms for unstable situations (i.e., highly turbulent atmospheric conditions). It is a refined point source Gaussian air quality model for use in all stability conditions (i.e., all conditions of atmospheric turbulence) for complex terrain.
- OCD – Offshore and coastal dispersion model (OCD) is a Gaussian model developed to determine the impact of offshore emissions from point, area or line sources on the air quality of coastal regions. It incorporates overwater plume transport and dispersion as well as changes that occur as the plume crosses the shoreline.

=== Alternative models ===
- ADAM – Air force dispersion assessment model (ADAM) is a modified box and Gaussian dispersion model which incorporates thermodynamics, chemistry, heat transfer, aerosol loading, and dense gas effects.
- ADMS 5 – Atmospheric Dispersion Modelling System (ADMS 5) is an advanced dispersion model developed in the United Kingdom for calculating concentrations of pollutants emitted both continuously from point, line, volume and area sources, or discretely from point sources.
- AFTOX – A Gaussian dispersion model that handles continuous or puff, liquid or gas, elevated or surface releases from point or area sources.
- DEGADIS – Dense gas dispersion (DEGADIS) is a model that simulates the dispersion at ground level of area source clouds of denser-than-air gases or aerosols released with zero momentum into the atmosphere over flat, level terrain.
- HGSYSTEM – A collection of computer programs developed by Shell Research Ltd. and designed to predict the source-term and subsequent dispersion of accidental chemical releases with an emphasis on dense gas behavior.
- HOTMAC and RAPTAD – HOTMAC is a model for weather forecasting used in conjunction with RAPTAD which is a puff model for pollutant transport and dispersion. These models are used for complex terrain, coastal regions, urban areas, and around buildings where other models fail.
- HYROAD – The hybrid roadway model integrates three individual modules simulating the pollutant emissions from vehicular traffic and the dispersion of those emissions. The dispersion module is a puff model that determines concentrations of carbon monoxide (CO) or other gaseous pollutants and particulate matter (PM) from vehicle emissions at receptors within 500 meters of the roadway intersections.
- ISC3 – A Gaussian model used to assess pollutant concentrations from a wide variety of sources associated with an industrial complex. This model accounts for: settling and dry deposition of particles; downwash; point, area, line, and volume sources; plume rise as a function of downwind distance; separation of point sources; and limited terrain adjustment. ISC3 operates in both long-term and short-term modes.
- OBODM – A model for evaluating the air quality impacts of the open burning and detonation (OB/OD) of obsolete munitions and solid propellants. It uses dispersion and deposition algorithms taken from existing models for instantaneous and quasi-continuous sources to predict the transport and dispersion of pollutants released by the open burning and detonation operations.
- PANACHE – Fluidyn-PANACHE is an Eulerian (and Lagrangian for particulate matter), 3-dimensional finite volume fluid mechanics model designed to simulate continuous and short-term pollutant dispersion in the atmosphere, in simple or complex terrain.
- PLUVUEII – A model that estimates atmospheric visibility degradation and atmospheric discoloration caused by plumes resulting from the emissions of particles, nitrogen oxides, and sulfur oxides. The model predicts the transport, dispersion, chemical reactions, optical effects and surface deposition of such emissions from a single point or area source.
- SCIPUFF – A puff dispersion model that uses a collection of Gaussian puffs to predict three-dimensional, time-dependent pollutant concentrations. In addition to the average concentration value, SCIPUFF predicts the statistical variance in the concentrations resulting from the random fluctuations of the wind.
- SDM – Shoreline dispersion model (SDM) is a Gaussian dispersion model used to determine ground-level concentrations from tall stationary point source emissions near a shoreline.
- SLAB – A model for denser-than-air gaseous plume releases that utilizes the one-dimensional equations of momentum, conservation of mass and energy, and the equation of state. SLAB handles point source ground-level releases, elevated jet releases, releases from volume sources and releases from the evaporation of volatile liquid spill pools.

=== Screening models ===
These are models that are often used before applying a refined air quality model to determine if refined modelling is needed.

- AERSCREEN – The screening version of AERMOD. It produces estimates of concentrations, without the need for meteorological data, that are equal to or greater than the estimates produced by AERMOD with a full set of meteorological data. The U.S. EPA released version 11060 of AERSCREEN on 11 March 2010 with a subsequent update, version 11076, on 17 March 2010. The U.S. EPA published the "Clarification memorandum on AERSCREEN as the recommended screening model" on 11 April 2011.
- CTSCREEN – The screening version of CTDMPLUS.
- SCREEN3 – The screening version of ISC3.
- TSCREEN – Toxics screening model (TSCREEN) is a Gaussian model for screening toxic air pollutant emissions and their subsequent dispersion from possible releases at superfund sites. It contains 3 modules: SCREEN3, PUFF, and RVD (Relief Valve Discharge).
- VALLEY – A screening, complex terrain, Gaussian dispersion model for estimating 24-hour or annual concentrations resulting from up to 50 point and area emission sources.
- COMPLEX1 – A multiple point source screening model with terrain adjustment that uses the plume impaction algorithm of the VALLEY model.
- RTDM3.2 – Rough terrain diffusion model (RTDM3.2) is a Gaussian model for estimating ground-level concentrations of one or more co-located point sources in rough (or flat) terrain.
- VISCREEN – A model that calculates the impact of specified emissions for specific transport and dispersion conditions.

=== Photochemical models ===
Photochemical air quality models have become widely utilized tools for assessing the effectiveness of control strategies adopted by regulatory agencies. These models are large-scale air quality models that simulate the changes of pollutant concentrations in the atmosphere by characterizing the chemical and physical processes in the atmosphere. These models are applied at multiple geographical scales ranging from local and regional to national and global.

- Models-3/CMAQ – The latest version of the community multi-scale air quality (CMAQ) model has state-of-the-science capabilities for conducting urban to regional scale simulations of multiple air quality issues, including tropospheric ozone, fine particles, toxics, acid deposition, and visibility degradation.
- CAMx – The comprehensive air quality model with extensions (CAMx) simulates air quality over many geographic scales. It handles a variety of inert and chemically active pollutants, including ozone, particulate matter, inorganic and organic PM2.5/PM10, and mercury and other toxics.
- REMSAD – The regional modeling system for aerosols and deposition (REMSAD) calculates the concentrations of both inert and chemically reactive pollutants by simulating the atmospheric processes that affect pollutant concentrations over regional scales. It includes processes relevant to regional haze, particulate matter and other airborne pollutants, including soluble acidic components and mercury.
- UAM-V – The urban airshed model was a pioneering effort in photochemical air quality modelling in the early 1970s and has been used widely for air quality studies focusing on ozone.

== Other models developed in the United States ==
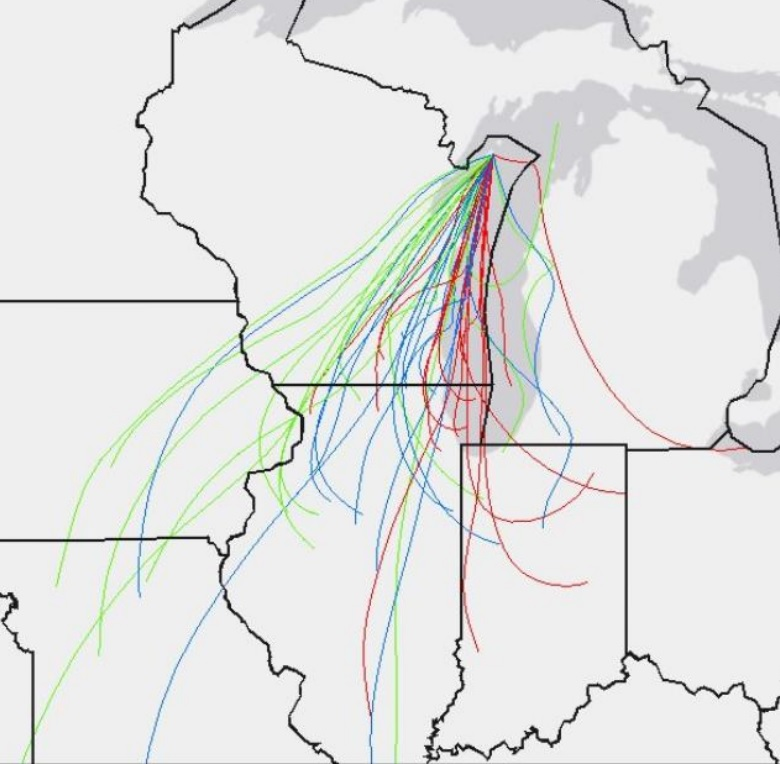
2016 HYSPLIT map

- CHARM – A model capable of simulating dispersion of toxics and particles. It can calculate impacts of thermal radiation from fires, overpressures from mechanical failures and explosions, and nuclear radiation from radionuclide releases. CHARM is capable of handling effects of complex terrain and buildings. A Lagrangian puff screening version and Eulerian full-function version are available. More information is available here.
- HYSPLIT – Hybrid Single Particle Lagrangian Integrated Trajectory Model. Developed at NOAA's Air Resources Laboratory. The HYSPLIT model is a complete system for computing simple air parcel trajectories to complex dispersion and deposition simulations. More information about this model can be found at
- PUFF-PLUME – A Gaussian chemical/radionuclide dispersion model that includes wet and dry deposition, real-time input of meteorological observations and forecasts, dose estimates from inhalation and gamma shine, and puff or plume dispersion modes. It is the primary model for emergency response use for atmospheric releases of radioactive materials at the Savannah River Site of the United States Department of Energy. It was first developed by the Pacific Northwest National Laboratory (PNNL) in the 1970s.
- Puff model – Puff is a volcanic ash tracking model developed at the University of Alaska Fairbanks. It requires NWP wind field data on a geographic grid covering the area over which ash may be dispersed. Representative ash particles are initiated at the volcano's location and then allowed to advect, diffuse, and settle within the atmosphere. The location of the particles at any time after the eruption can be viewed using the post-processing software included with the model. Output data is in netCDF format and can also be viewed with a variety of software. More information on the model is available here.

== Models developed in the United Kingdom ==
- ADMS-5 – See the description of this model in the alternative models section of the models accepted by the U.S. EPA.
- ADMS-URBAN – A model for simulating dispersion on scales ranging from a street scale to citywide or county-wide scale, handling most relevant emission sources such as traffic, industrial, commercial, and domestic sources. It is also used for air quality management and assessments of current and future air quality vis-a-vis national and regional standards in Europe and elsewhere.
- ADMS-Roads – A model for simulating dispersion of vehicular pollutant emissions from small road networks in combination with emissions from industrial plants. It handles multiple road sources as well as multiple point, line or area emission sources and the model operation is similar to the other ADMS models
- ADMS-Screen – A screening model for rapid assessment of the air quality impact of a single industrial stack to determine if more detailed modelling is needed. It combines the dispersion modelling algorithms of the ADMS models with a user interface requiring minimal input data.
- GASTAR – A model for simulating accidental releases of denser-than-air flammable and toxic gases. It handles instantaneous and continuous releases, releases from jet sources, releases from evaporation of volatile liquid pools, variable terrain slopes and ground roughness, obstacles such as fences and buildings, and time-varying releases.
- NAME – Numerical atmospheric-dispersion modelling environment (NAME) is a local to global scale model developed by the UK's Met Office. It is used for: forecasting of air quality, air pollution dispersion, and acid rain; tracking radioactive emissions and volcanic ash discharges; analysis of accidental air pollutant releases and assisting in emergency response; and long-term environmental impact analysis. It is an integrated model that includes boundary layer dispersion modelling.
- UDM – Urban dispersion model is a Gaussian puff based model for predicting the dispersion of atmospheric pollutants in the range of 10m to 25 km throughout the urban environment. It is developed by the Defense Science and Technology Laboratory for the UK Ministry of Defence. It handles instantaneous, continuous, and pool releases, and can model gases, particulates, and liquids. The model has a three regime structure: that of single building (area density < 5%), urban array (area density > 5%) and open. The model can be coupled with the US model SCIPUFF to replace the open regime and extend the model's prediction range.

== Models developed in continental Europe ==
The European Topic Centre on Air and Climate Change, which is part of the European Environment Agency (EEA), maintains an online Model Documentation System (MDS) that includes descriptions and other information for almost all of the dispersion models developed by the countries of Europe. The MDS currently (July 2012) contains 142 models, mostly developed in Europe. Of those 142 models, some were subjectively selected for inclusion here. Anyone interested in seeing the complete MDS can access it here.

Some of the European models listed in the MDS are public domain and some are not. Many of them include a pre-processor module for the input of meteorological and other data, and many also include a post-processor module for graphing the output data and/or plotting the area impacted by the air pollutants on maps.

The country of origin is included for each of the European models listed below.

- AEROPOL (Estonia) – The AERO-POLlution model developed at the Tartu Observatory in Estonia is a Gaussian plume model for simulating the dispersion of continuous, buoyant plumes from stationary point, line and area sources over flat terrain on a local to regional scale. It includes plume depletion by wet and/or dry deposition as well as the effects of buildings in the plume path.
- Airviro Gauss (Sweden) – A gaussian dispersion model that handles point, road, area and grid sources developed by SMHI. Plumes follow trajectories from a wind model and each plume has a cutoff dependent on wind speed. The model also support irregular calculation grids.
- Airviro Grid (Sweden) – A simplified eulerian model developed by SMHI. Can handle point, road, area and grid sources. Includes dry and wet deposition and sedimentation.
- Airviro Heavy Gas (Sweden) – A model for heavy gas dispersion developed by SMHI.
- Airviro receptor model (Sweden)- An inverse dispersion model developed by SMHI. Used to find emission sources.
- ATSTEP (Germany) – Gaussian puff dispersion and deposition model used in the decision support system RODOS (real-time on-line decision support) for nuclear emergency management. RODOS is operational in Germany by the Federal Office for Radiation Protection (BfS) and test-operational in many other European countries. More information on RODOS is available here and on the ATSTEP model here.
- AUSTAL2000 (Germany) – The official air dispersion model to be used in the permitting of industrial sources by the German Federal Environmental Agency. The model accommodates point, line, area and volume sources of buoyant plumes. It has capabilities for building effects, complex terrain, plume depletion by wet or dry deposition, and first order chemical reactions. It is based on the LASAT model developed by Ingenieurbüro Janicke Gesellschaft für Umweltphysik.
- BUO-FMI (Finland) – This model was developed by the Finnish Meteorological Institute (FMI) specifically for estimating the atmospheric dispersion of neutral or buoyant plume gases and particles emitted from fires in warehouses and chemical stores. It is a hybrid of a local scale Gaussian plume model and another model type. Plume depletion by dry deposition is included but wet deposition is not included.
- CAR-FMI (Finland) – This model was developed by the Finnish Meteorological Institute (FMI) for evaluating atmospheric dispersion and chemical transformation of vehicular emissions of inert (CO, NOx) and reactive (NO, NO_{2}, O_{3}) gases from a road network of line sources on a local scale. It is a Gaussian line source model which includes an analytical solution for the chemical cycle NO-O_{3}-NO_{2}.
- CAR-International (The Netherlands) – Calculation of air pollution from road traffic (CAR-International) is an atmospheric dispersion model developed by the Netherlands Organisation for Applied Scientific Research. It is used for simulating the dispersion of vehicular emissions from roadway traffic.
- DERMA (Denmark) – The Danish Emergency Response Model of the Atmosphere (DERMA) is a Lagrangian atmospheric dispersion model employing a hybrid stochastic particle-puff description of turbulent diffusion. It is an off-line model making use of meteorological data, currently from the non-hydrostatic numerical weather prediction model Harmonie of 2 km horizontal resolution or from the global model of ECMWF. The model employs particle-size dependent dry and wet deposition parameterizations. DERMA is developed for emergency preparedness purposes, and it is integrated with the ARGOS decision-support system. Utilizing statistical ensemble techniques, it is able to quantify uncertainties stemming from the meteorological data used or from the source description. Based on monitoring data, it can be used for inverse modelling aiming at localizing and describing an unknown source.
- DIPCOT (Greece) – Dispersion over complex terrain (DIPCOT) is a model developed in the National Centre of Scientific Research "DEMOKRITOS" of Greece that simulates dispersion of buoyant plumes from multiple point sources over complex terrain on a local to regional scale. It does not include wet deposition or chemical reactions.
- DISPERSION21 (Sweden) – This model was developed by the Swedish Meteorological and Hydrological Institute (SMHI) for evaluating air pollutant emissions from existing or planned industrial or urban sources on a local scale. It is a Gaussian plume model for point, area, line and vehicular traffic sources. It includes plume penetration of inversions aloft, building effects, NOx chemistry and it can handle street canyons. It does not include wet or dry deposition, complex atmospheric chemistry, or the effects of complex terrain.
- DISPLAY-2 (Greece) – A vapour cloud dispersion model for neutral or denser-than-air pollution plumes over irregular, obstructed terrain on a local scale. It accommodates jet releases as well as two-phase (i.e., liquid-vapor mixtures) releases. This model was also developed at the National Centre of Scientific Research "DEMOKRITOS" of Greece.
- EK100W (Poland) – A Gaussian plume model used for air quality impact assessments of pollutants from industrial point sources as well as for urban air quality studies on a local scale. It includes wet and dry deposition. The effects of complex terrain are not included.
- EMEP (EMEP-MSCW, Norway) – A multi-scale atmospheric transport and chemistry model (open source, emep-ctm). The official model used by UNECE for supporting the Convention on Long-range Transboundary AIr Pollution. It is one of the models of the Copernicus Atmosphere Monitoring Service, with excellent performances. A three-dimensional, Eulerian model, suitable from urban to global scale. It scales to thousands of CPUs, and simulations over one year with 0.1x0.1 degrees resolution on global scale have been performed. On the other end, downscaling to 50m resolution can be performed using the urban EMEP model (uEMEP).
- FARM (Italy) – The Flexible Air quality Regional Model (FARM) is a multi-grid Eulerian model for dispersion, transformation and deposition of airborne pollutants in gas and aerosol phases, including photo-oxidants, aerosols, heavy metals and other toxics. It is suited for case studies, air quality assessments, scenarios analyses and pollutants forecast.
- FLEXPART (Austria/Germany/Norway) – An efficient and flexible Lagrangian particle transport and diffusion model for regional to global applications, with capability for forward and backward mode. Freely available. Developed at BOKU Vienna, Technical University of Munich, and NILU.
- GRAL (Austria) – The GRAz Lagrangian model was initially developed at the Graz University of Technology and it is a dispersion model for buoyant plumes from multiple point, line, area and tunnel portal sources. It handles flat or complex terrain (mesoscale prognostic flow field model) including building effects (microscale prognostic flow field model) but it has no chemistry capabilities. The model is freely available: http://lampz.tugraz.at/~gral/
- HAVAR (Czech Republic) – A Gaussian plume model integrated with a puff model and a hybrid plume-puff model, developed by the Czech Academy of Sciences, is intended for routine and/or accidental releases of radionuclides from single point sources within nuclear power plants. The model includes radioactive plume depletion by dry and wet deposition as well as by radioactive decay. For the decay of some nuclides, the creation of daughter products that then grow into the plume is taken into account.
- IFDM (Belgium) – The immission frequency distribution model, developed at the Flemish Institute for Technological Research (VITO), is a Gaussian dispersion model used for point and area sources dispersing over flat terrain on a local scale. The model includes plume depletion by dry or wet deposition and has been updated to handle building effects and the O_{3}-NOx-chemistry. It is not designed for complex terrain or other chemically reactive pollutants.
- INPUFF-U (Romania) – This model was developed by the National Institute of Meteorology and Hydrology in Bucharest, Romania. It is a Gaussian puff model for calculating the dispersion of radionuclides from passive emission plumes on a local to urban scale. It can simulate accidental or continuous releases from stationary or mobile point sources. It includes wet and dry deposition. Building effects, buoyancy effects, chemical reactions and effects of complex terrain are not included.
- LAPMOD (Italy) – The LAPMOD (LAgrangian Particle MODel) modeling system is developed by Enviroware and it is available for free. LAPMOD is a Lagrangian particle model fully coupled to the diagnostic meteorological model CALMET and can be used to simulate the dispersion of inert pollutants as well as odors and radioactive substances. It includes dry and wet deposition algorithms and advanced numerical schemes for plume rise (Janicke and Janicke, Webster and Thomson). It can simulate inert pollutants, odors and radioactive substances and it is part of ARIES, the official Italian modeling system for nuclear emergencies operated by ISPRA and by the regional environmental protection agency of Emilia-Romagna, Italy.
- LOTOS-EUROS (The Netherlands) – the long term ozone simulation – European operational smog (LOTOS-EUROS) model was developed by the Netherlands Organisation for Applied Scientific Research (TNO) and Netherlands National Institute for Public Health and the Environment (RIVM) in The Netherlands. It is designed for modelling the dispersion of pollutants (such as: photo-oxidants, aerosols, heavy metals) over all of Europe. It includes simple reaction chemistry as well as wet and dry deposition.
- MATCH (Sweden) – A multi-scale atmospheric transport and chemistry (MATCH). A three-dimensional, Eulerian model, suitable from urban to global scale.
- MEMO (Greece) – A Eulerian non-hydrostatic prognostic mesoscale model for wind flow simulation. It was developed by the Aristotle University of Thessaloniki in collaboration with the University of Karlsruhe (TH). This model is designed for describing atmospheric transport phenomena in the local-to-regional scale, often referred to as mesoscale air pollution models.
- MERCURE (France) – An atmospheric dispersion modeling CFD code developed by Electricite de France (EDF) and distributed by ARIA Technologies, a French company. The code is a version of the CFD software ESTET, developed by EDF's Laboratoire National d'Hydraulique.
- MODIM (Slovak Republic) – A model for calculating the dispersion of continuous, neutral or buoyant plumes on a local to regional scale. It integrates a Gaussian plume model for single or multiple point and area sources with a numerical model for line sources, street networks and street canyons. It is intended for regulatory and planning purposes.
- MSS (France) – Micro-swift-spray is a Lagrangian particle model used to predict the transport and dispersion of contaminants in urban environments. The SWIFT portion of this model predicts a mass-consistent wind field that considers terrain; no-penetration conditions for building boundaries; Rockle zones for recirculation, edge, and rooftop separation; and background and locally generated turbulence. The spray portion of the tool handles the dispersion of passive gases, dense gases, and particulates. Spray also accounts for plume buoyancy effects, wet and dry depositions, and calculates microscale pressure fields for integration with building models. The MSS development team is found at ARIA Technologies (France) and U.S. integration activities are led by Leidos. Validation testing of MSS has been done in conjunction with JEM and HPAC tool releases and the model is coupled with SCIPUFF/UDM to create a nested dispersion capability inside HPAC. For more information on MSS see http://www.aria.fr.
- MUSE (Greece) – A photochemical atmospheric dispersion model developed by Professor Nicolas Moussiopoulos at the Aristotle University of Thessaloniki in Greece. It is intended for the study of photochemical smog formation in urban areas and assessment of control strategies on a local to regional scale. It can simulate dry deposition and transformation of pollutants can be treated using any suitable chemical reaction mechanism.
- OML (Denmark) – A model for dispersion calculations of continuous neutral or buoyant plumes from single or multiple, stationary point and area sources. It has some simple methods for handling photochemistry (primarily for NO_{2}) and for handling complex terrain. The model was developed by the National Environmental Research Institute of Denmark. It is now maintained by the Department of Environmental Science, Aarhus University. For further reference see as well: OML home page
- ONM9440 (Austria) – A Gaussian dispersion model for continuous, buoyant plumes from stationary sources for use in flat terrain areas. It includes plume depletion by dry deposition of solid particulates.
- OSPM (Denmark) – The operational street pollution model (OSPM) is a practical street pollution model, developed by the National Environmental Research Institute of Denmark. It is now maintained by the Department of Environmental Science, Aarhus University. For almost 20 years, OSPM has been routinely used in many countries for studying traffic pollution, performing analyses of field campaign measurements, studying efficiency of pollution abatement strategies, carrying out exposure assessments and as reference in comparisons to other models. OSPM is generally considered as state-of-the-art in applied street pollution modelling. For further reference see as well: OSPM home page
- PANACHE (France) – fluidyn-PANACHE is a self-contained fully 3D fluid dynamics software package designed to simulate accidental or continuous industrial and urban pollutant dispersion into the atmosphere. It simulates release and toxic/flammables pollutants dispersion in various weather conditions in calculated 3D complex winds and turbulence fields. Gas, particles, droplets induced flow and transport/diffusion is simulated with Navier-Stokes equations for jet-like, dense, cold, cryogenic or hot, buoyant releases. The application covers the very short scale (tens of meters) and the local scale (ten kilometers) where the complex flow pattern as related to obstacles, variable land uses, topography is calculated explicitly.
- PROKAS-V (Germany) – A Gaussian dispersion model for evaluating the atmospheric dispersion of air pollutants emitted from vehicular traffic on a road network of line sources on a local scale.
- PLUME (Bulgaria) – A conventional Gaussian plume model used in many regulatory applications. The basis of the model is a single simple formula which assumes constant wind speed and reflection from the ground surface. The horizontal and vertical dispersion parameters are a function of downwind distance and stability. The model was developed for routine applications in air quality assessment, regulatory purposes and policy support.
- POLGRAPH (Portugal) – This model was developed at the University of Aveiro, Portugal by Professor Carlos Borrego. It was designed for evaluating the impact of industrial pollutant releases and for air quality assessments. It is a Gaussian plume dispersion model for continuous, elevated point sources to be used on a local scale over flat or gently rolling terrain.
- RADM (France) – The random-walk advection and dispersion model (RADM) was developed by ACRI-ST, an independent research and development organization in France. It can model gas plumes and particles (including pollutants with exponential decay or formation rates) from single or multiple stationary, mobile or area sources. Chemical reaction, radioactive decay, deposition, complex terrain, and inversion conditions are accommodated.
- RIMPUFF (Denmark) – A local and regional scale real-time puff diffusion model developed by Risø National Laboratory for Sustainable Energy, Technical University of Denmark. Risø DTU. RIMPUFF is an operational emergency response model in use for assisting emergency management organisations dealing with chemical, nuclear, biological and radiological (CBRN) releases to the atmosphere. RIMPUFF is in operation in several European national emergency centres for preparedness and prediction of nuclear accidental releases (RODOS, EURANOS, ARGOS), chemical gas releases (ARGOS), and serves also as a decision support tool during active combatting of airborne transmission of various biological infections, including e.g. Foot-and Mouth Disease outbreaks. DEFRA Foot and Mouth Disease.
- SAFE AIR II (Italy) – The simulation of air pollution from emissions II (SAFE AIR II) was developed at the Department of Physics, University of Genoa, Italy to simulate the dispersion of air pollutants above complex terrain at local and regional scales. It can handle point, line, area and volume sources and continuous plumes as well as puffs. It includes first-order chemical reactions and plume depletion by wet and dry deposition, but it does not include any photochemistry.
- SEVEX (Belgium) – The Seveso expert model simulates the accidental release of toxic and/or flammable material over flat or complex terrain from multiple pipe and vessel sources or from evaporation of volatile liquid spill pools. The accidental releases may be continuous, transient or catastrophic. The integrated model can handle denser-than-air gases as well as neutral gases (i.e., neither denser than or lighter than air). It does not include handling of multi-component material, nor does it provide for chemical transformation of the releases. The model's name is derived from the major disaster caused by the accidental release of highly toxic gases that occurred in Seveso, Italy in 1976.
- SNAP (Norway) – The Severe Nuclear Accident Programme (SNAP) model is a Lagrangian type atmospheric dispersion model specialized on modelling dispersion of radioactive debris.
- SPRAY (Italy, France) – A Lagrangian particle dispersion model (LPDM) which simulates the transport, dispersion and deposition of pollutants emitted from sources of different kind over complex terrain and with the presence of obstacles. The model easily takes into account complex situations, such as the presence of breeze cycles, strong meteorological inhomogeneities and non-stationary, low wind calm conditions and recirculations. Simulations can cover area ranging from very local (less than one kilometer) to regional (hundreds of kilometres) scales. Plume rise of hot emission from stack is taken into account using a Briggs formulation. Algorithms for particle-oriented dry/wet deposition processes and for considering the gravitational settling are present. Dry deposition can be computed on ground and also on ceil/roof and on lateral faces of obstacles. Dispersion under generalized geometries like arches, tunnels and walkways can be performed. Dense gas dispersion is simulated using five conservation equations (mass, energy, vertical momentum and two horizontal momenta) based on Glandening et al. (1984) and Hurley and Manins (1995). Plume spread at the ground due to gravity is also simulated by a method (Anfossi et al., 2009), based on Eidsvik (1980).
- STACKS (The Netherlands) – A Gaussian plume dispersion model for point and area buoyant plumes to be used over flat terrain on a local scale. It includes building effects, NO_{2} chemistry and plume depletion by deposition. It is used for environmental impact studies and evaluation of emission reduction strategies.
- STOER.LAG (Germany) – A dispersion model designed to evaluate accidental releases of hazardous and/or flammable materials from point or area sources in industrial plants. It can handle neutral and denser-than-air gases or aerosols from ground-level or elevated sources. The model accommodates building and terrain effects, evaporation of volatile liquid spill pools, and combustion or explosion of flammable gas-air mixtures (including the impact of heat and pressure waves caused by a fire or explosion).
- SYMOS'97 (Czech Republic) – A model developed by the Czech Hydrometeorological Institute for dispersion calculations of continuous neutral or buoyant plumes from single or multiple point, area or line sources. It can handle complex terrain and it can also be used to simulate the dispersion of cooling tower plumes.
- TCAM is a multiphase three-dimensional eulerian grid model designed by ESMA group of University of Brescia, for modelling dispersion of pollutants (in particular photochemical and aerosol) at mesoscale.
- UDM-FMI (Finland) – This model was developed by the Finnish Meteorological Institute (FMI) as an integrated Gaussian urban scale model intended for regulatory pollution control. It handles multiple point, line, area and volume sources and it includes chemical transformation (for NO_{2}), wet and dry deposition (for SO2), and downwash phenomena (but no building effects).
- VANADIS (Poland) – 3D dynamic FEM model Vanadis-GitHub Vanadis-poster

== Models developed in Australia ==
- AUSPLUME – A dispersion model that has been designated as the primary model accepted by the Environmental Protection Authority (EPA) of the Australian state of Victoria. (update:AUSPLUME V6 will no longer be the air pollution dispersion regulatory model in Victoria from 1 January 2014. From this date the air pollution dispersion regulatory model in Victoria will be AERMOD.)
- pDsAUSMOD – Australian graphical user interface for AERMOD
- pDsAUSMET – Australian meteorological data processor for AERMOD
- LADM – An advanced model developed by Australia's Commonwealth Scientific and Industrial Research Organisation (CSIRO) for simulating the dispersion of buoyant pollution plumes and predicting the photochemical formation of smog over complex terrain on a local to regional scale. The model can also handle fumigated plumes (see the books listed below in the "Further reading" section for an explanation of fumigated plumes).
- TAPM – An advanced dispersion model integrated with a pre-processor for providing meteorological data inputs. It can handle multiple pollutants, and point, line, area and volume sources on a local, city or regional scale. The model capabilities include building effects, plume depletion by deposition, and a photochemistry module. This model was also developed by Australia's Commonwealth Scientific and Industrial Research Organisation (CSIRO).
- DISPMOD – A Gaussian atmospheric dispersion model for point sources located in coastal regions. It was designed specifically by the Western Australian Department of Environment to simulate the plume fumigation that occurs when an elevated onshore pollution plume intersects a growing thermal internal boundary layer (TIBL) contained within offshore air flow coming onshore.
- AUSPUFF – A Gaussian puff model designed for regulatory use by CSIRO. It includes some simple algorithms for the chemical transformation of reactive air pollutants.

== Models developed in Canada ==
- MLCD – Modèle Lagrangien à courte distance is a Lagrangian particle dispersion model (LPDM) developed in collaboration by Environment Canada's Canadian Meteorological Centre (CMC) and by the Department of Earth and Atmospheric Sciences of University of Alberta. This atmospheric dispersion and deposition model is designed to estimate air concentrations and surface deposition of pollutants for very short range emergency problems (less than ~10 km from the source).
- MLDPn – Modèle Lagrangien de dispersion de particules d'ordre n is a Lagrangian particle dispersion model (LPDM) developed by Environment Canada's Canadian Meteorological Centre (CMC). This atmospheric and aquatic transport and dispersion model is designed to estimate air and water concentrations and ground deposition of pollutants for various emergency response problems at different scales (local to global). It is used to forecast and track volcanic ash, radioactive material, forest fire smoke, chemical hazardous substances as well as oil slicks.
- Trajectory – The trajectory model, developed by Environment Canada's Canadian Meteorological Centre (CMC), is a simple tool designed to calculate the trajectory of a few air parcels moving in the 3D wind field of the atmosphere. The model provides a quick estimate of the expected trajectory of an air parcel by the advection transport mechanism, originating from (forward trajectory) or arriving at (backward trajectory) a specified geographical location and a vertical level.

== Models developed in India ==
- HAMS-GPS – Software used for management of environment, health and safety (EHS). It can be used for training as well as research involving dispersion modeling, accident analysis, fires, explosions, risk assessments and other related subjects.

=== Air pollution dispersion models ===
- ADMS 5
- AERMOD
- CALPUFF
- DISPERSION21
- PUFF-PLUME
- MERCURE
- NAME
- OSPM
- SAFE AIR
- RIMPUFF
- HAMS-GPS EIA modeling

=== Others ===
- Air pollution dispersion terminology
- Atmospheric dispersion modeling
- Bibliography of atmospheric dispersion modeling
- Roadway air dispersion modeling
- Wind profile power law
