= UK Dispersion Modelling Bureau =

The UK Dispersion Modelling Bureau was part of the Met Office, the UK's national weather and meteorological service. The meteorologists in the bureau are among the UK's leading experts in areas such:

- meteorology
- air quality studies and forecasting
- air pollution dispersion modelling
- industrial emissions

== Consultancy services ==
The bureau consisted of a team of air quality specialists dedicated to providing advice, support, and consultancy service to industry, government, local authorities and private consultants. The team had particular expertise with long and short range atmospheric pollution dispersion modelling using the NAME, AERMOD, ADMS, BOXURB and other dispersion models.

The bureau's consultancy services included:

- height assessments of industrial stacks discharging airborne pollutants
- long-term environmental impact studies of airborne pollutant emissions
- scenario modelling and analyses of accidental releases of airborne pollutants
- Air pollution forecasting studies
- studies of long-range trans-boundary transport of air pollutants
- urban air quality modelling
- providing site-specific meteorological data

The Met Office continues to conduct atmospheric dispersion and air quality research and provides a range of services to UK and international governmental bodies, research funds and commercial customers.

== See also ==
- Accidental release source terms
- Bibliography of atmospheric dispersion modelling
- Air pollution dispersion terminology
- Air Quality Modeling Group
- Air Resources Laboratory
- AP 42 Compilation of Air Pollutant Emission Factors
- Atmospheric dispersion modelling
- Atmospheric Studies Group
- List of atmospheric dispersion models
- UK Atmospheric Dispersion Modelling Liaison Committee
