= Accidental release source terms =

Accidental release source terms are the mathematical equations that quantify the flow rate at which accidental releases of liquid or gaseous pollutants into the ambient environment which can occur at industrial facilities such as petroleum refineries, petrochemical plants, natural gas processing plants, oil and gas transportation pipelines, chemical plants, and many other industrial activities. Governmental regulations in many countries require that the probability of such accidental releases be analyzed and their quantitative impact upon the environment and human health be determined so that mitigating steps can be planned and implemented.

There are a number of mathematical calculation methods for determining the flow rate at which gaseous and liquid pollutants might be released from various types of accidents. Such calculational methods are referred to as source terms, and this article on accidental release source terms explains some of the calculation methods used for determining the mass flow rate at which gaseous pollutants may be accidentally released.

== Accidental release of pressurized gas ==
When gas stored under pressure in a closed vessel is discharged to the atmosphere through a hole or other opening, the gas velocity through that opening may be choked (i.e., it has attained a maximum) or it may be non-choked.

Choked velocity, also referred to as sonic velocity, occurs when the ratio of the absolute source pressure to the absolute downstream pressure is equal to or greater than [(k + 1) / 2]^{k / (k − 1)}, where k is the specific heat ratio of the discharged gas (sometimes called the isentropic expansion factor and sometimes denoted as $\gamma$).

For many gases, k ranges from about 1.09 to about 1.41, and therefore [(k + 1) / 2]^{k / (k − 1 )} ranges from 1.7 to about 1.9, which means that choked velocity usually occurs when the absolute source vessel pressure is at least 1.7 to 1.9 times as high as the absolute downstream ambient atmospheric pressure.

When the gas velocity is choked, the equation for the mass flow rate in SI metric units is:

$$Q \;=\; C\;A\; \sqrt{\;k\;\rho\;P\; \left(\frac{2}{k+ 1}\right)^\frac{k + 1}{k - 1}}$$

or this equivalent form:

$$Q \;=\; C\;A\;P\;\sqrt{\left(\frac{\;\,k\;M}{Z\;R\;T}\right)\left(\frac{2}{k + 1}\right)^\frac{k + 1}{k - 1}}$$

For the above equations, although the gas velocity reaches a maximum and becomes choked, the mass flow rate is not choked. The mass flow rate can still be increased if the source pressure is increased.

Whenever the ratio of the absolute source pressure to the absolute downstream ambient pressure is less than [ (k + 1) / 2]^{k / (k − 1)}, then the gas velocity is non-choked (i.e., sub-sonic) and the equation for mass flow rate is:

$$Q \;=\; C\;A\;\sqrt{\;2\;\rho\;P\;\left[\frac{k}{k - 1}\right]\left[\left(\frac{P_A}{P}\right)^\frac{2}{k}-\;\,\left(\frac{\;P_A}{P}\right)^\frac{k + 1}{k}\;\right]}$$

or this equivalent form:

$$Q \;=\; C\;A\;P\; \sqrt{\left[\frac{2\;M}{Z\;R\;T}\right]\left[\frac{k}{k - 1}\right]\left[\,\left(\frac{P_A}{P}\right)^\frac{2}{k} -\;\,\left(\frac{P_A}{P}\right)^\frac{k + 1}{k}\;\right]}$$

where:
Q	= mass flow rate, kg/s
C	= discharge coefficient, dimensionless (usually about 0.72)
A	= discharge hole area, m^{2}
k	= c_{p}/c_{v} of the gas
c_{p}	= specific heat of the gas at constant pressure
c_{v}	= specific heat of the gas at constant volume
$\rho$	= real gas density at P and T, kg/m^{3}
P	= absolute upstream pressure, Pa
P_{A}	= absolute ambient or downstream pressure, Pa
M	= the gas molecular mass, kg/kmol (also known as the molecular weight)
R	= the Universal Gas Law Constant = 8314.5 Pa·m^{3}/(kmol·K)
T	= absolute upstream gas temperature, K
Z	= the gas compressibility factor at P and T, dimensionless

The above equations calculate the initial instantaneous mass flow rate for the pressure and temperature existing in the source vessel when a release first occurs. The initial instantaneous flow rate from a leak in a pressurized gas system or vessel is much higher than the average flow rate during the overall release period because the pressure and flow rate decrease with time as the system or vessel empties. Calculating the flow rate versus time since the initiation of the leak is much more complicated, but more accurate. Two equivalent methods for performing such calculations are presented and compared at.

The technical literature can be very confusing because many authors fail to explain whether they are using the universal gas law constant R which applies to any ideal gas or whether they are using the gas law constant R_{s} which only applies to a specific individual gas. The relationship between the two constants is R_{s} = R/M.

Notes:

- The above equations are for a real gas.
- For an ideal gas, Z = 1 and ρ is the ideal gas density.
- 1 kilomole (kmol) = 1000 moles = 1000 gram-moles = kilogram-mole.

=== Ramskill's equation for non-choked mass flow ===
P.K. Ramskill's equation for the non-choked flow of an ideal gas is shown below as equation (1):

(1) $Q = C \;\rho_A\;A\;\sqrt{\frac{\;\,2\;P}{\rho} \cdot \frac{k}{k-1} \cdot \left[\; 1 - {\left(\frac{P_A}{P}\right)^\frac{k - 1}{k}}\right]}$

The gas density, $\rho$_{A}, in Ramskill's equation is the ideal gas density at the downstream conditions of temperature and pressure and it is defined in equation (2) using the ideal gas law:

(2) $\rho_A = \frac{M\;P_A}{R \;T_A}$

Since the downstream temperature T_{A} is not known, the isentropic expansion equation below is used to determine T_{A} in terms of the known upstream temperature T:

(3) $\frac{T_A}{T} = \left(\frac{P_A}{P}\right)^\frac{k - 1}{k}$

Combining equations (2) and (3) results in equation (4) which defines $\rho$_{A} in terms of the known upstream temperature T:

(4) $\rho_A = \frac{M \;P^\frac{k - 1}{k}}{R \;T \;P_A^{-\frac{1}{k}}}$

Using equation (4) with Ramskill's equation (1) to determine non-choked mass flow rates for ideal gases gives identical results to the results obtained using the non-choked flow equation presented in the previous section above.

== Evaporation of non-boiling liquid pool ==
Three different methods of calculating the rate of evaporation from a non-boiling liquid pool are presented in this section. The results obtained by the three methods are somewhat different.

=== The U.S. Air Force method ===
The following equations are for predicting the rate at which liquid evaporates from the surface of a pool of liquid which is at or near the ambient temperature. The equations were derived from field tests performed by the U.S. Air Force with pools of liquid hydrazine.

$$E = \left(4.161 \times 10^{-5}\right) \cdot u^{0.75} \cdot T_F \cdot M \cdot \frac{P_S}{P_H}$$

where:
E	= evaporation flux, kg/m^{2}·min of pool surface
u	= windspeed just above the liquid surface, m/s
T_{A}	= absolute ambient temperature, K
T_{F}	= pool liquid temperature correction factor, dimensionless
T_{P}	= pool liquid temperature, °C
M	= pool liquid molecular weight, dimensionless
P_{S}	= pool liquid vapor pressure at ambient temperature, mmHg
P_{H}	= hydrazine vapor pressure at ambient temperature, mmHg (see equation below)

If T_{P} = 0 °C or less, then T_{F} = 1.0

If T_{P} > 0 °C, then T_{F} = 1.0 + 0.0043 T_{P}^{2}

$$P_H = 760 \cdot e^{65.3319 - \frac{7245.2}{T_A} - 8.22\;\ln\left(T_a\right) + 0.0061557\;T_A}$$

where:
$e$	= 2.7183, the base of the natural logarithm system
$\ln$	= natural logarithm

=== The U.S. EPA method ===
The following equations are for predicting the rate at which liquid evaporates from the surface of a pool of liquid which is at or near the ambient temperature. The equations were developed by the United States Environmental Protection Agency using units which were a mixture of metric usage and United States usage. The non-metric units have been converted to metric units for this presentation.

$$E = \frac{0.1288 \cdot A \cdot P \cdot M^{0.667} \cdot u^{0.78}}{T}$$

NB, the constant used here is 0.284 from the mixed unit formula/2.205 lb/kg. The 82.05 become 1.0 = (ft/m)² × mmHg/kPa.

where:
E	= evaporation rate, kg/min
u	= windspeed just above the pool liquid surface, m/s
M	= pool liquid molecular weight, dimensionless
A	= surface area of the pool liquid, m^{2}
P	= vapor pressure of the pool liquid at the pool temperature, kPa
T	= pool liquid absolute temperature, K

The U.S. EPA also defined the pool depth as 0.01 m (i.e., 1 cm) so that the surface area of the pool liquid could be calculated as:

A = (pool volume, in m^{3})/(0.01)

Notes:

- 1 kPa = 0.0102 kgf/cm^{2} = 0.01 bar
- mol = mole
- atm = atmosphere

=== Stiver and Mackay's method ===
The following equations are for predicting the rate at which liquid evaporates from the surface of a pool of liquid which is at or near the ambient temperature. The equations were developed by Warren Stiver and Dennis Mackay of the Chemical Engineering Department at the University of Toronto.

$$E = \frac{k \cdot P \cdot M}{R \cdot T_A}$$

where:
E	= evaporation flux, kg/m^{2}·s of pool surface
k	= mass transfer coefficient, m/s = 0.002 u
T_{A}	= absolute ambient temperature, K
M	= pool liquid molecular weight, dimensionless
P	= pool liquid vapor pressure at ambient temperature, Pa
R	= the universal gas law constant = 8314.5 Pa·m^{3}/(kmol·K)
u	= windspeed just above the liquid surface, m/s

== Evaporation of boiling cold liquid pool ==
The following equation is for predicting the rate at which liquid evaporates from the surface of a pool of cold liquid (i.e., at a liquid temperature of about 0 °C or less).

$$E = 0.0001\;M (7.7026 - 0.0288\;B)\; e^{-(0.0077\;B) - 0.1376}$$

where:
E	= evaporation flux, (kg/min)/m^{2} of pool surface
B	= pool liquid atmospheric boiling point, °C
M	= pool liquid molecular weight, dimensionless
e	= the base of the natural logarithm system = 2.7183

== Adiabatic flash of liquefied gas release ==
Liquefied gases such as ammonia or chlorine are often stored in cylinders or vessels at ambient temperatures and pressures well above atmospheric pressure. When such a liquefied gas is released into the ambient atmosphere, the resultant reduction of pressure causes some of the liquefied gas to vaporize immediately. This is known as "adiabatic flashing" and the following equation, derived from a simple heat balance, is used to predict how much of the liquefied gas is vaporized.

$$X = 100\;\frac{H_s^L - H_a^L}{H_a^V - H_a^L}$$

where:
X	= weight percent vaporized
H_{s}^{L}	= source liquid enthalpy at source temperature and pressure, J/kg
H_{a}^{V}	= flashed vapor enthalpy at atmospheric boiling point and pressure, J/kg
H_{a}^{L}	= residual liquid enthalpy at atmospheric boiling point and pressure, J/kg

If the enthalpy data required for the above equation is unavailable, then the following equation may be used.

$$X = 100 \cdot c_p \cdot \frac{T_s - T_b}{H}$$

where:
X	= weight percent vaporized
c_{p}	= source liquid specific heat, J/(kg °C)
T_{s}	= source liquid absolute temperature, K
T_{b}	= source liquid absolute atmospheric boiling point, K
H	= source liquid heat of vaporization at atmospheric boiling point, J/kg

== See also ==
- Choked flow
- Orifice plate
- Flash evaporation
