= Fundamentals of Stack Gas Dispersion =

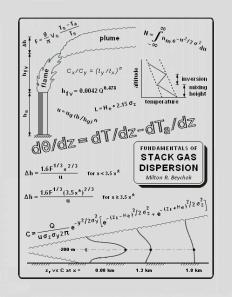
- The book's cover
- Author: Milton R. Beychok
- Language: English
- Subject: Air dispersion modeling
- Publisher: Milton R. Beychok
- Publication date: 2005 (4th Edition)
- Media type: Downloadable in PDF format
- Pages: 201 (21.5 cm × 27.6 cm)
- ISBN: 0-9644588-0-2
- OCLC: 33462889
- Dewey Decimal: 628.5/32
- LC Class: TD885 .B49 1994

Fundamentals of Stack Gas Dispersion is a book devoted to the fundamentals of air pollution dispersion modeling of continuous, buoyant pollution plumes from stationary point sources. The first edition was published in 1979. The current fourth edition was published in 2005.

The subjects covered in the book include atmospheric turbulence and stability classes, buoyant plume rise, Gaussian dispersion calculations and modeling, time-averaged concentrations, wind velocity profiles, fumigations, trapped plumes and gas flare stack plumes. The constraints and assumptions involved in the basic equations are fully explained.

The book has received favorable reviews, including a description of its "simple straightforward explanations" for a "full course in single-source dispersive modeling".

The book has been purchased in 84 countries and As of 2015 is available in 233 libraries worldwide. It has been referenced or cited as an educational resource more than 880 times in the technical literature and on the Internet, including 34 regulatory publications of state or national governmental agencies worldwide. It has also been used as recommended reading or a textbook in 61 university courses.

The book is now available only as a downloadable version in PDF format.

== Book contents ==
- Chapter 1: Atmospheric Parameters
- Chapter 2: Gaussian Dispersion Equations
- Chapter 3: Dispersion Coefficients
- Chapter 4: Plume Rise
- Chapter 5: Time-Averaging Of Concentrations
- Chapter 6: Wind Velocity Profiles
- Chapter 7: Calculating Stack Gas Plume Dispersion
- Chapter 8: Trapped Plumes
- Chapter 9: Fumigation
- Chapter 10: Meteorological Data
- Chapter 11: Flare Stack Plume Rise
- Chapter 12: Miscellany

== See also ==
- Accidental release source terms
- ADMS 3
- AERMOD
- Air pollution dispersion terminology
- Air Quality Modeling Group
- Atmospheric dispersion modeling
- Bibliography of atmospheric dispersion modeling
- List of atmospheric dispersion models
- UK Atmospheric Dispersion Modelling Liaison Committee
- Useful conversions and formulas for air dispersion modeling
