= HYSPLIT =

Atmospheric simulation software

The Hybrid Single-Particle Lagrangian Integrated Trajectory model (HYSPLIT) is a computer model that is used to compute air parcel trajectories to determine how far and in what direction a parcel of air, and subsequently air pollutants, will travel. HYSPLIT is also capable of calculating air pollutant dispersion, chemical transformation, and deposition. The HYSPLIT model was developed by the National Oceanic and Atmospheric Administration (NOAA) Air Resources Laboratory and the Australian Bureau of Meteorology Research Centere in 1998. The model derives its name from the usage of both Lagrangian and Eulerian approaches.

== Model development ==
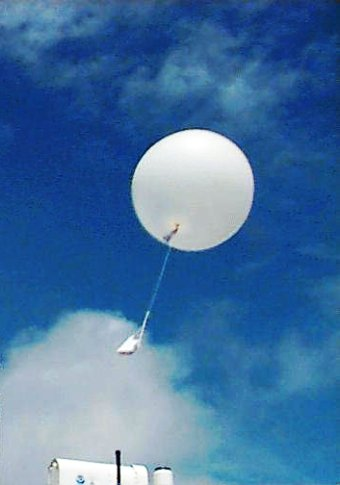
Radiosonde telemetry instrument carried into the atmosphere by a weather balloon to measure various atmospheric parameters

Early interest in computing air parcel trajectories stemmed from the nuclear arms race of the Cold War. In 1949, the United States government used wind data from radiosonde balloon measurements to determine the likely sources of air parcel trajectories to find a Soviet atomic test site. The initial version of HYSPLIT (HYSPLIT1) was developed in 1982 and obtained meteorological data solely from rawinsonde measurements, and its dispersion calculations assumed uniform daytime mixing and no mixing at night. The second version of HYSPLIT (HYSPLIT2) improved upon HYSPLIT1 by varying the mixing strength. The third version of HYSPLIT (HYSPLIT3) utilized numerical weather prediction models to compute meteorology rather than rawinsonde data alone, improving spatial and temporal resolution of the model. HYSPLIT4, created in 1998, serves as the basis for current model versions.

== Applications ==
The HYSPLIT model is widely used for both research applications and emergency response events to forecast and establish source-receptor relationships from a variety of air pollutants and hazardous materials. Examples of use include:

- Back trajectory analysis to establish source-receptor relationships
- Tracking and forecasting radioactive material
- Real-time wildland fire smoke predictions
- Wind blown dust
- Stationary sources of anthropogenic emissions

The HYSPLIT model can be run interactively on the Real-Time Environmental Applications and Display System (READY) web site or installed on PC, Mac, or Linux applications, which use a graphical user interface, or automated through scripts ('PySPLIT' package in Python, 'openair' and 'splitr' packages in R). HYSPLIT is rather unusual in that it may be run in client-server mode (HYSPLIT-WEB) from the NOAA website, allowing members of the public to select gridded historical or forecast datasets, to configure model runs, and retrieve model results with a web browser. Annual trainings on the installation, configuration, and use of the modeling system and its applications are offered by HYSPLIT developers.

=== Wildland fire smoke forecasting ===
The HYSPLIT model is extensively used by United States Land Management Agencies to forecast potential human health impacts from wildland fire smoke. Smoke from wildland fires can directly impact both the public and wildfire personnel health. The U.S. Department of Agriculture Forest Service AirFire Research Team uses HYSPLIT as a component of its BlueSky modeling framework to calculate the likely trajectories of smoke parcels given off by a fire. When combined with various other independent models of fire information, fuel loading, fire consumption, fire emissions, and meteorology within the BlueSky framework, the user can calculate the downwind concentrations of several pollutants emitted by a fire, such as Carbon Dioxide or Particulate Matter. This information is useful for land management and air regulatory agencies to understand the impacts from both planned and unplanned wildland fires and the smoke-related consequences of a spectrum of wildfire management tactics and mitigation strategies. In emergency response situations, incident management teams can deploy technical specialist Air Resource Advisors to assist with predicting and communicating smoke impacts to a wide variety of stakeholders, including incident teams, air quality regulators, and the public. Air Resource Advisors are specially trained to interpret BlueSky forecasts to provide timely smoke impact and forecast information to address public health risks and concerns.

=== Back trajectory analysis ===
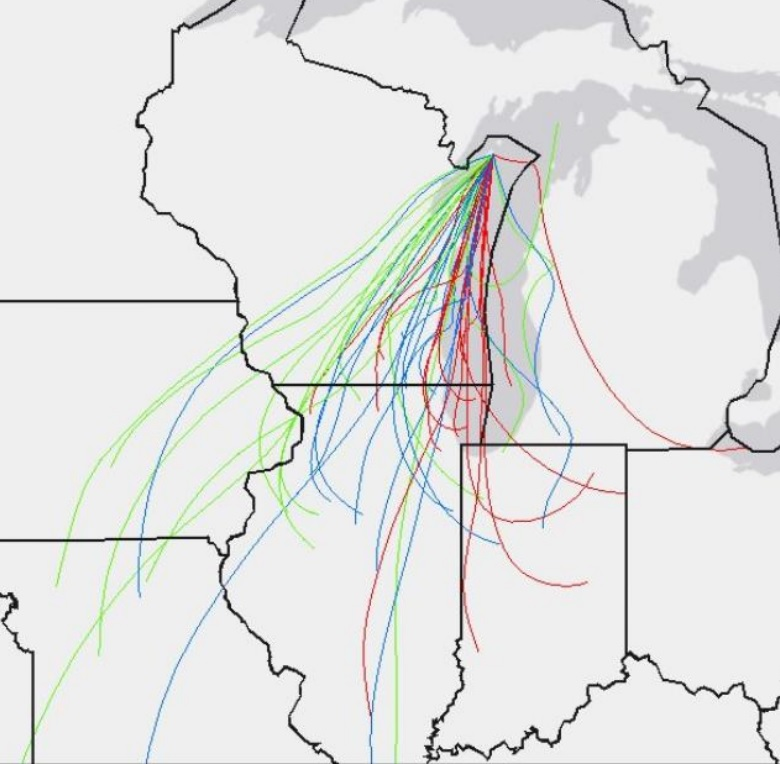
HYSPLIT back trajectory output determines likely sources of air pollution affecting Door County, Wisconsin

One popular use of HYSPLIT is to establish whether high levels of air pollution at one location are caused by transport of air contaminants from another location. HYSPLIT's back trajectories, combined with satellite images (for example, from NASA's MODIS satellites), can provide insight into whether high air pollution levels are caused by local air pollution sources or whether an air pollution problem was blown in on the wind. Analyzing back trajectories over extended periods of time (month-year) can begin to show the geographic origin most associated with elevated concentrations. Several methods for identifying the contribution of high concentrations exist, including frequency based approaches, potential source contribution function, concentration weighted trajectory, and trajectory clustering.

For example, HYSPLIT back trajectories show that most air pollution in Door County, Wisconsin originates from outside the county. This map shows how air travels to the pollution monitor in Newport State Park. Because the monitor at Newport State park is near the shore, only the red lines (which show the lower air currents) meaningfully depict the path of ozone to the monitor. Unfortunately, as shown on the map, these lower air currents carry polluted air from major urban areas. But further inland, the air from higher up mixes more, so all color lines are significant when tracing the path of air pollution further inland. Fortunately, these higher air currents (shown in green and blue) blow in from cleaner, mostly rural areas.

== Limitations ==
Although the HYSPLIT model has been improved since its inception in the 1980s, there are several considerations for users. Key among them are the model's inability to account for secondary chemical reactions and reliance on the input meteorological data's resolution, which can have coarse temporal and spatial resolution. Users should evaluate results carefully in areas with complex terrain. Despite its use in a wide range of emergency response events, HYSPLIT is not a U.S. Environmental Protection Agency (U.S. EPA) preferred or recommended model for regulatory purposes. AERMOD, a steady-state gaussian plume dispersion model, is the US EPA's preferred model for estimating point source impacts for primary emitted pollutants. Photochemical grid models, like the Community Multi-scale Air Quality Model (CMAQ), can simulate the complex chemical and physical processes in the atmosphere (including secondary formation of air pollutants) at a large scale.

== See also ==
- Air pollution dispersion terminology
- Atmospheric dispersion modeling
- List of atmospheric dispersion models
- Useful conversions and formulas for air dispersion modeling
