= MEMO model (wind-flow simulation) =

The MEMO model (version 6.2) is a Eulerian non-hydrostatic prognostic mesoscale model for wind-flow simulation. It was developed by the Aristotle University of Thessaloniki in collaboration with the University of Karlsruhe. The MEMO Model together with the photochemical dispersion model MARS are the two core models of the European zooming model (EZM). This model belongs to the family of models designed for describing atmospheric transport phenomena in the local-to-regional scale, frequently referred to as mesoscale air pollution models.

== History ==
Initially, EZM was developed for modelling the transport and chemical transformation of pollutants in selected European regions in the frame of the EUROTRAC sub-project EUMAC and therefore it was formerly called the EUMAC Zooming Model (EUROTRAC, 1992). EZM has evolved to be one of the most frequently applied mesoscale air pollution model systems in Europe. It has already been successfully applied for various European airsheds including the Upper Rhine valley and the areas of Basel, Graz, Barcelona, Lisbon, Madrid, Milan, London, Cologne, Lyon, The Hague, Athens (Moussiopoulos, 1994; Moussiopoulos, 1995) and Thessaloniki. More details are to be found elsewhere (Moussiopoulos 1989), (Flassak 1990), (Moussiopoulos et al. 1993).

== Model equations ==
The prognostic mesoscale model MEMO describes the dynamics of the atmospheric boundary layer. In the present model version, air is assumed to be unsaturated. The model solves the continuity equation, the momentum equations and several transport equations for scalars (including the thermal energy equation and, as options, transport equations for water vapour, the turbulent kinetic energy and pollutant concentrations).

== Transformation to terrain-following coordinates ==
The lower boundary of the model domain coincides with the ground. Because of the inhomogeneity of the terrain, it is not possible to impose boundary conditions at that boundary with respect to Cartesian coordinates. Therefore, a transformation of the vertical coordinate to a terrain-following one is performed. Hence, the originally irregularly bounded physical domain is mapped onto one consisting of unit cubes.

== Numerical solution of the equation system ==
The discretized equations are solved numerically on a staggered grid, i.e. the scalar quantities $\rho$, $p$ and $\theta$ are defined at the cell centre while the velocity components $u$, $v$ and $w$ are defined at the centre of the appropriate interfaces.

Temporal discretization of the prognostic equations is based on the explicit second order Adams-Bashforth scheme. There are two deviations from the Adams-Bashforth scheme: The first refers to the implicit treatment of the nonhydrostatic part of the mesoscale pressure perturbation $p_{{nh}}$. To ensure non-divergence of the flow field, an elliptic equation is solved. The elliptic equation is derived from the continuity equation wherein velocity components are expressed in terms of $p_{{nh}}$. Since the elliptic equation is derived from the discrete form of the continuity equation and the discrete form of the pressure gradient, conservativity is guaranteed (Flassak and Moussiopoulos, 1988). The discrete pressure equation is solved numerically with a fast elliptic solver in conjunction with a generalized conjugate gradient method. The fast elliptic solver is based on fast Fourier analysis in both horizontal directions and Gaussian elimination in the vertical direction (Moussiopoulos and Flassak, 1989).

The second deviation from the explicit treatment is related to the turbulent diffusion in vertical direction. In case of an explicit treatment of this term, the stability requirement may necessitate an unacceptable abridgement of the time increment. To avoid this, vertical turbulent diffusion is treated using the second order Crank–Nicolson method.

On principle, advective terms can be computed using any suitable advection scheme. In the present version of MEMO, a 3D second-order total-variation-diminishing (TVD) scheme is implemented which is based on the 1D scheme proposed by Harten (1986). It achieves a fair (but not any) reduction of numerical diffusion, the solution being independent of the magnitude of the scalar (preserving transportivity).

== Parameterizations ==
Turbulence and radiative transfer are the most important physical processes that have to be parameterized in a prognostic mesoscale model. In the MEMO model, radiative transfer is calculated with an efficient scheme based on the emissivity method for longwave radiation and an implicit multilayer method for shortwave radiation (Moussiopoulos 1987).

The diffusion terms may be represented as the divergence of the corresponding fluxes. For turbulence parameterizations, K-theory is applied. In case of MEMO turbulence can be treated either with a zero-, one- or two-equation turbulence model. For most applications a one-equation model is used, where a conservation equation for the turbulent kinetic energy is solved.

== Initial and boundary conditions ==
In MEMO, initialization is performed with suitable diagnostic methods: a mass-consistent initial wind field is formulated using an objective analysis model and scalar fields are initialized using appropriate interpolating techniques (Kunz, R., 1991). Data needed to apply the diagnostic methods may be derived either from observations or from larger scale simulations.

Suitable boundary conditions have to be imposed for the wind velocity components $u$, $v$ and $w$, the potential temperature $\theta$ and pressure $p$ at all boundaries. At open boundaries, wave reflection and deformation may be minimized by the use of so-called radiation conditions (Orlanski 1976).

According to the experience gained so far with the model MEMO, neglecting large scale environmental information might result in instabilities in case of simulations over longer time periods.

For the nonhydrostatic part of the mesoscale pressure perturbation, homogeneous Neumann boundary conditions are used at lateral boundaries. With these conditions, the wind velocity component perpendicular to the boundary remains unaffected by the pressure change.

At the upper boundary, Neumann boundary conditions are imposed for the horizontal velocity components and the potential temperature. To ensure non-reflectivity, a radiative condition is used for the hydrostatic part of the mesoscale pressure perturbation $p_h$ at that boundary. Hence, vertically propagating internal gravity waves are allowed to leave the computational domain (Klemp and Durran 1983). For the nonhydrostatic part of the mesoscale pressure perturbation, homogeneous staggered Dirichlet conditions are imposed. Being justified by the fact that nonhydrostatic effects are negligible at large heights, this condition is necessary, if singularity of the elliptic pressure equation is to be avoided in view of the Neumann boundary conditions at all other boundaries.

The lower boundary coincides with the ground (or, more precisely, a height above ground corresponding to its aerodynamic roughness). For the non-hydrostatic part of the mesoscale pressure perturbation, inhomogeneous Neumann conditions are imposed at that boundary. All other conditions at the lower boundary follow from the assumption that the –Obukhov similarity theory is valid.

The one way interactive nesting facility is possible within MEMO. Thus, successive simulations on grids of increasing resolution are possible. During these simulations, the results of the application to a coarse grid are used as boundary conditions for the application to the finer grid (Kunz and Moussiopoulos, 1995).

== Grid definition ==
The governing equations are solved numerically on a staggered grid. Scalar quantities as the temperature, pressure, density and also the cell volume are defined at the centre of a grid cell and the velocity components $u$, $v$ and $w$ at the centre of the appropriate interface. Turbulent fluxes are defined at different locations: Shear fluxes are defined at the centre of the appropriate edges of a grid cell and normal stress fluxes at scalar points. With this definition, the outgoing fluxes of momentum, mass, heat and also turbulent fluxes of a grid cell are identical to incoming flux of the adjacent grid cell. So the numerical method is conservative.

== Topography and surface type ==
For calculations with MEMO, a file must be provided which contains orography height and surface type for each grid location The following surface types are distinguished and must be stored as percentage:

- water (type: 1)
- arid land (type: 2)
- few vegetation (type: 3)
- farmland (type: 4)
- forest (type: 5)
- suburban area (type: 6)
- urban area (type: 7)

Only surface types 1–6 have to be stored. Type 7 is the difference between 100% and the sum of types 1–6. If the percentage of a surface type is 100%, then write the number 10 and for all other surface types the number 99.

The orography height is the mean height for each grid location above sea level in meter.

== Meteorological data ==
The prognostic model MEMO is a set of partial differential equations in three spatial directions and in time. To solve these equations, information about the initial state in the whole domain and about the development of all relevant quantities at the lateral boundaries is required.

=== Initial state ===
To generate an initial state for the prognostic model, a diagnostic model (Kunz, R., 1991) is applied using measured temperature and wind data. Both data can be provided as:

- surface measurements i.e. single measurements directly above the surface (not necessary)
- upper air soundings (i.e., soundings that consist of two or more measurements at different heights) at a constant geographical location is required (with at least one sounding for temperature and wind velocity).

=== Time-dependent boundary conditions ===
Information about quantities at the lateral boundaries can be taken into account as surface measurements and upper air soundings. Therefore, a key word and the time when boundary data is given must occur in front of a set of boundary information.

== Nesting facility ==
In MEMO, a one-way interactive nesting scheme is implemented. With this nesting scheme a coarse grid and a fine grid simulation can be nested. During the coarse grid simulation, data is interpolated and written to a file. A consecutive fine grid simulation uses this data as lateral boundary values.

== See also ==
- Bibliography of atmospheric dispersion modeling
- Atmospheric dispersion modeling
- List of atmospheric dispersion models
- Air pollution dispersion terminology
- Useful conversions and formulas for air dispersion modeling
