= Monin–Obukhov similarity theory =

Function in fluid mathematics

Monin–Obukhov (M–O) similarity theory describes the non-dimensionalized mean flow and mean temperature in the surface layer under non-neutral conditions as a function of the dimensionless height parameter, named after Russian scientists A. S. Monin and A. M. Obukhov. Similarity theory is an empirical method that describes universal relationships between non-dimensionalized variables of fluids based on the Buckingham π theorem. Similarity theory is extensively used in boundary layer meteorology since relations in turbulent processes are not always resolvable from first principles.

An idealized vertical profile of the mean flow for a neutral boundary layer is the logarithmic wind profile derived from Prandtl's mixing length theory, which states that the horizontal component of mean flow is proportional to the logarithm of height. M–O similarity theory further generalizes the mixing length theory in non-neutral conditions by using so-called "universal functions" of dimensionless height to characterize vertical distributions of mean flow and temperature. The Obukhov length ($L$), a characteristic length scale of surface layer turbulence derived by Obukhov in 1946, is used for non-dimensional scaling of the actual height. M–O similarity theory marked a significant landmark of modern micrometeorology, providing a theoretical basis for micrometeorological experiments and measurement techniques.

== The Obukhov length ==
The Obukhov length $L$ is a length parameter for the surface layer in the boundary layer, which characterizes the relative contributions to turbulent kinetic energy from buoyant production and shear production. The Obukhov length was formulated using Richardson's criterion for dynamic stability. It was derived as,

$$L=-\dfrac{u_*^3}{\kappa \dfrac{g}{T}\dfrac{Q}{\rho c_p}}$$

where $\kappa\approx 0.40$ is the von Kármán constant, $u_*$ friction velocity, $Q$ turbulent heat flux, and $c_p$ heat capacity. Virtual potential temperature $\theta_v$ is often used instead of temperature $T$ to correct for the effects of pressure and water vapor. $Q$ can be written as vertical eddy flux,

$$Q=\rho c_p \overline{w'\theta_v'}$$

with $w'$ and $\theta_v'$ perturbations of vertical velocity and virtual potential temperature, respectively. Therefore, the Obukhov length can also be defined as,

$$L=-\dfrac{u_*^3}{\kappa \dfrac{g}{\overline{\theta_v}}\overline{w'\theta_v'}}$$

The Obukhov length also acts as a criterion for the static stability of surface layer. When $L<0$, the surface layer is statically unstable, and when $L>0$ the surface layer is statically stable. The absolute magnitude of $L$ indicates the deviation from statically neutral state, with smaller $|L|$ values corresponding to larger deviations from neutral conditions. When $|L|$ is small and $L<0$, buoyant processes dominate the production of turbulent kinetic energy compared with shear production. By definition, under neutral conditions $L\rightarrow\infty$. The Obukhov length $L$ is used for non-dimensionalization of height $z$ in similarity theory.

== Governing formulae for similarity relations ==
M–O similarity theory parameterizes fluxes in the surface layer as a function of the dimensionless length parameter $\zeta=z/L$. From the Buckingham Pi theorem of dimensional analysis, two dimensionless group can be formed from the basic parameter set $\{ u_*, g/\overline{\theta_v}, \partial\overline{u}/\partial z, z, \overline{w'\theta_v'}\}$,

$\dfrac{\kappa z}{u_*}\dfrac{\partial \overline{u}}{\partial z}$, and

$\zeta =\dfrac{z}{L}$

From there, a function $\varphi_M(\zeta)$ can be determined to empirically describe the relationship between the two dimensionless quantities, called a universal function. Similarly, $\varphi_H(\zeta)$ can be defined for the dimensionless group of mean temperature profile. Mean wind and temperature profiles therefore satisfy the following relations,

$$\dfrac{\partial \overline{u}}{\partial z} =\dfrac{u_*}{\kappa z}\varphi_M(\zeta)$$

$$\dfrac{\partial \overline{\theta_v}}{\partial z} =\dfrac{\theta_*}{\kappa z}\varphi_H(\zeta)$$

where $\theta_*= - \dfrac{\overline{w'\theta_v'}}{u_*}$ is the characteristic dynamical temperature, $\varphi_M$ and $\varphi_H$ are the universal functions of momentum and heat. The eddy diffusivity coefficients for momentum and heat fluxes are defined as follows,

$$K_M = \kappa z\dfrac{ u_*}{\varphi_M(\zeta)},\ K_H = \kappa z\dfrac{ u_*}{\varphi_H(\zeta)}$$

$K_M$ and $K_H$ can be related with the turbulent Prandtl number $Pr_t$,

$$\dfrac{K_H}{K_M}=\dfrac{1}{Pr_t}>1$$

In reality, the universal functions need to be determined using experimental data when applying M–O similarity theory. Although the choice of universal functions is not unique, certain functional forms have been proposed and are widely accepted for fitting experimental data.

== Universal functions of the Monin–Obukhov similarity theory ==
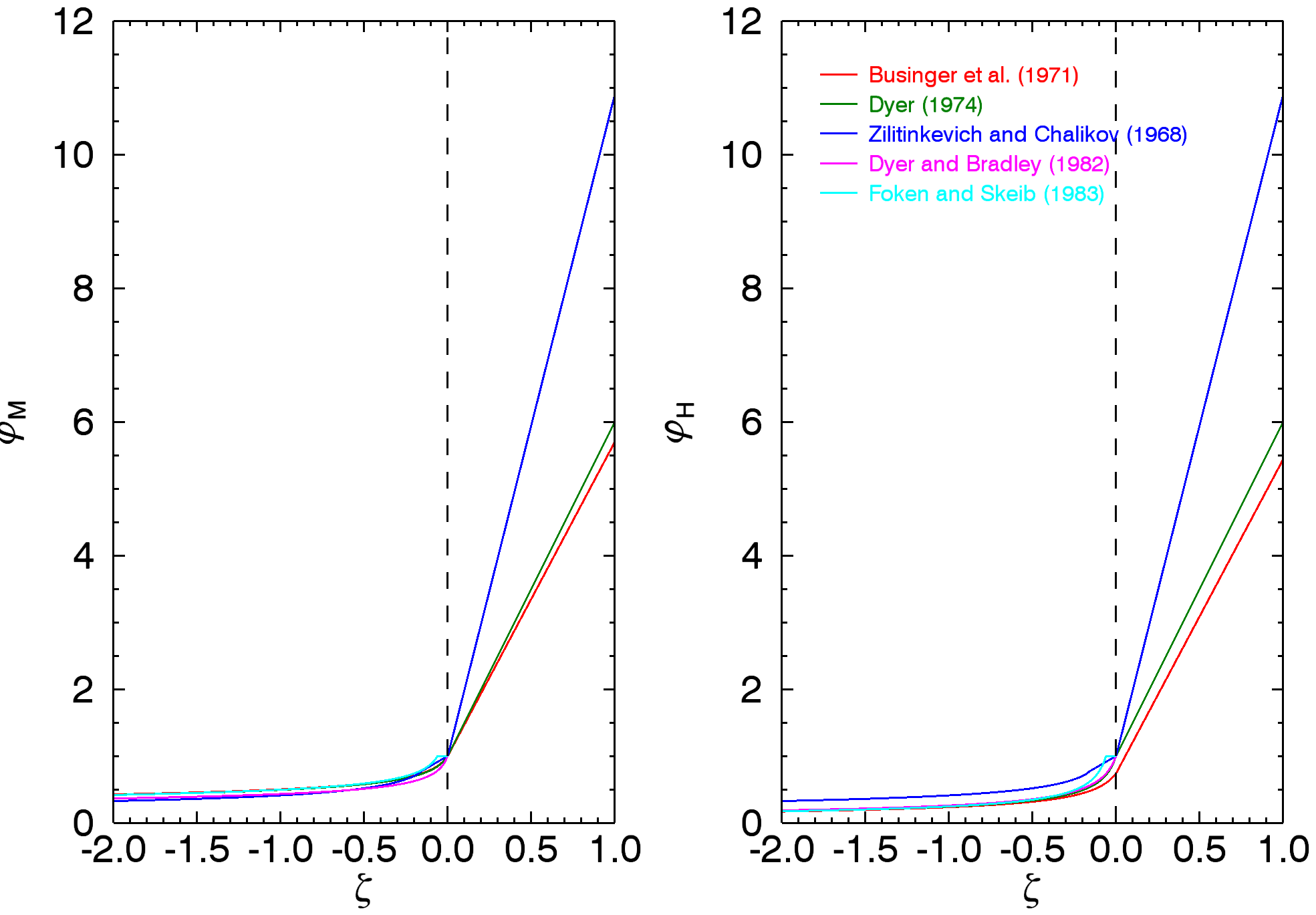
Universal functions for Monin–Obukhov similarity theory

Several functional forms have been proposed to represent the universal functions of similarity theory. Because the Obukhov length is determined when $L\Big(\dfrac{\partial Ri}{\partial z}\Big)_{z=0}=1$, where $Ri$ is the Richardson number, the following condition must be satisfied by the universal function chosen,

$$\varphi(0)=1$$

A first order approximation of the universal function for momentum flux is,

$$\varphi_M(\zeta)=1+\beta\zeta$$

where $\beta\approx 6$. However this is only applicable when $0<\zeta<1$. For conditions where $\zeta<0$, the relation is,

$$\varphi_M^4-\gamma\zeta\varphi_M^3=1$$

where $\gamma$ is a coefficient to be determined from experimental data. This equation can be further approximated by $\varphi_M=(1+\gamma\zeta)^{-1/4}$ when $-2<\zeta<0$.

Based on the results of the 1968 Kansas experiment, the following universal functions are determined for horizontal mean flow and mean virtual potential temperature,

$$\varphi_M(\zeta)=(1-15\zeta)^{-1/4}\quad -2<\zeta <0$$

$$\varphi_M(\zeta)=1+4.7\zeta\quad 0<\zeta <1$$

$$\varphi_H(\zeta)=0.74(1-9\zeta)^{-1/2}\quad  -2<\zeta <0$$

$$\varphi_H(\zeta)=0.74+4.7\zeta\quad 0<\zeta <1$$

Other methods which determine the universal functions using the relation between $\zeta$ and $Ri$ are also used.

For sublayers with significant roughness, e.g. vegetated surfaces or urban areas, the universal functions must be modified to include the effects of surface roughness.

== Validations ==
A myriad of experimental efforts was devoted to the validation of the M–O similarity theory. Field observations and computer simulations have generally demonstrated that the M–O similarity theory is well satisfied.

=== In field measurements ===
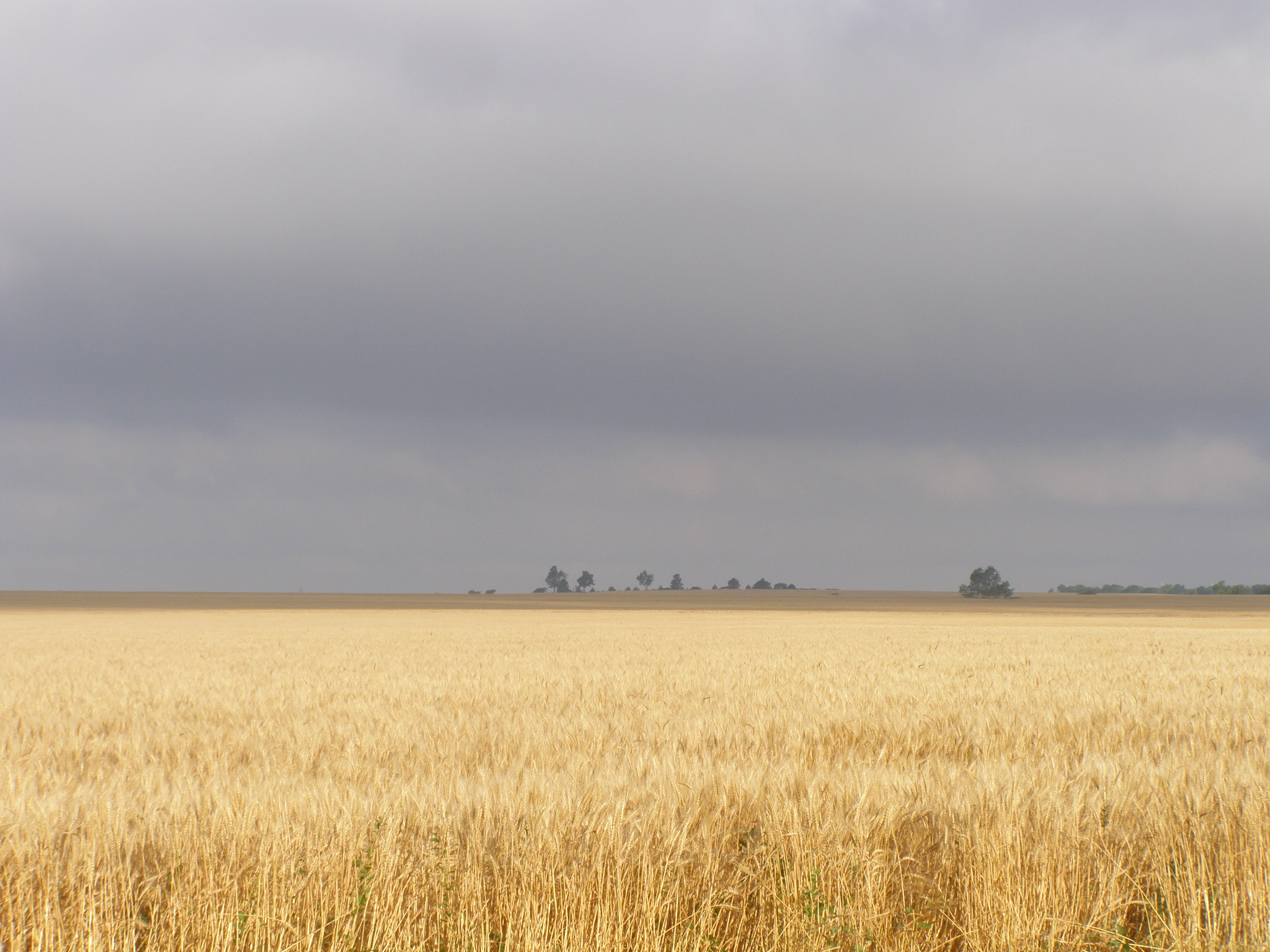
A Kansas wheat field, the flat terrain is needed for the experiment

The 1968 Kansas experiment found great consistency between measurements and predictions from similarity relations for the entire range of stability values. A flat wheat field in Kansas served as the experiment site, with winds measured by anemometers mounted at different heights on a 32 m tower. The temperature profile was also measured in a similar manner. Results from the Kansas field study indicated that the ratio of eddy diffusivities of heat and momentum was approximately 1.35 under neutral conditions. A similar experiment was conducted in a flat field in northwestern Minnesota in 1973. This experiment used both ground and balloon-based observations of the surface layer and further validated the theoretical predictions from similarity.

=== In large eddy simulations ===
In addition to field experiments, analysis of M–O similarity theory can be conducted using high-resolution large eddy simulations. The simulation indicates that the temperature field agrees well with M–O similarity. However, the velocity field shows significant anomalies from M–O similarity.

== Limitations ==
M–O similarity theory, albeit successful for surface layers from experimental validations, is essentially a diagnostic empirical theory based upon local first order turbulence closure. Typically, 10%~20% of errors are associated with universal functions. When applied to vegetated areas or complex terrains, it can result in large discrepancies. Because universal functions are often determined under dry conditions, the applicability of M–O similarity theory under moist conditions was not well studied.

The basic parameter set of the M–O similarity theory includes buoyancy production $\dfrac{gQ}{T}$. It is argued that with such a parameter set, the scaling is applied to the integral features of the flow, whereas an eddy specific similarity relationship prefers the usage of energy dissipation rate $\epsilon_0$. This scheme is able to explain anomalies of M–O similarity theory, but involves non-locality to modeling and experiments.

== See also ==
- Obukhov length
- Surface layer
- Logarithmic wind profile
- Mixing length model
