= AERMOD =

Atmospheric dispersion modeling system

The AERMOD atmospheric dispersion modeling system is an integrated system that includes three modules:

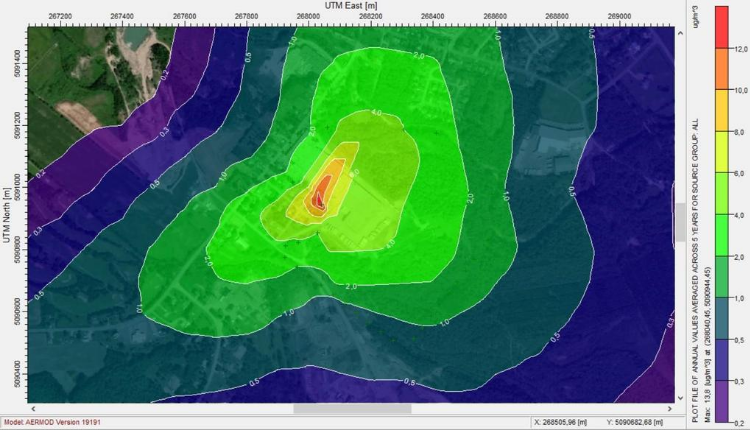
Graphic display of Aermod output

- A steady-state dispersion model designed for short-range (up to 50 kilometers) dispersion of direct air pollutant emissions primarily from stationary industrial sources.
- A meteorological data preprocessor (AERMET) that accepts surface meteorological data, upper air soundings, and optionally, data from on-site instrument towers. It then calculates atmospheric parameters needed by the dispersion model, such as atmospheric turbulence characteristics, mixing heights, friction velocity, Monin-Obukov length and surface heat flux.
- A terrain preprocessor (AERMAP) whose main purpose is to provide a physical relationship between terrain features and the behavior of air pollution plumes. It generates location and height data for each receptor location. It also provides information that allows the dispersion model to simulate the effects of air flowing over hills or splitting to flow around hills.

AERMOD also includes PRIME (Plume Rise Model Enhancements) which is an algorithm for modeling the effects of downwash created by the pollution plume flowing over nearby buildings.

== History of the development of AERMOD ==
AERMOD was developed by the AERMIC (American Meteorological Society (AMS)/United States Environmental Protection Agency (EPA) Regulatory Model Improvement Committee), a collaborative working group of scientists from the AMS and the EPA. The AERMIC was initially formed in 1991.

The AERMIC developed AERMOD in seven steps:

- Initial model formulation
- Developmental evaluation
- Internal peer review and beta testing
- Revised model formulation
- Performance evaluation and sensitivity testing
- External peer review
- Submission to the EPA for consideration as a regulatory model.

On April 21 of 2000, the EPA proposed that AERMOD be adopted as the EPA's preferred regulatory model for both simple and complex terrain. On November 9 of 2005, AERMOD was adopted by the EPA and promulgated as their preferred regulatory model, effective as of December 9 of 2005. The entire developmental and adoption process took 14 years (from 1991 to 2005).

== Features and capabilities of AERMOD ==
Some of the primary features and capabilities of AERMOD are:

- Source types: Multiple point, area and volume sources
- Source releases: Surface, near surface and elevated sources
- Source locations: Urban or rural locations. Urban effects are scaled by population.
- Plume types: Continuous, buoyant plumes
- Plume deposition: Dry or wet deposition of particulates and/or gases
- Plume dispersion treatment: Gaussian model treatment in horizontal and in vertical for stable atmospheres. Non-Gaussian treatment in vertical for unstable atmospheres
- Terrain types: Simple or complex terrain
- Building effects: Handled by PRIME downwash algorithms
- Meteorology data height levels: Accepts meteorology data from multiple heights
- Meteorological data profiles: Vertical profiles of wind, turbulence and temperature are created

== See also ==
- Air pollution dispersion terminology
- Atmospheric dispersion modeling
- Bibliography of atmospheric dispersion modeling
- List of atmospheric dispersion models
- Useful conversions and formulas for air dispersion modeling
