= Newport State Park =

State Park in Wisconsin, United States

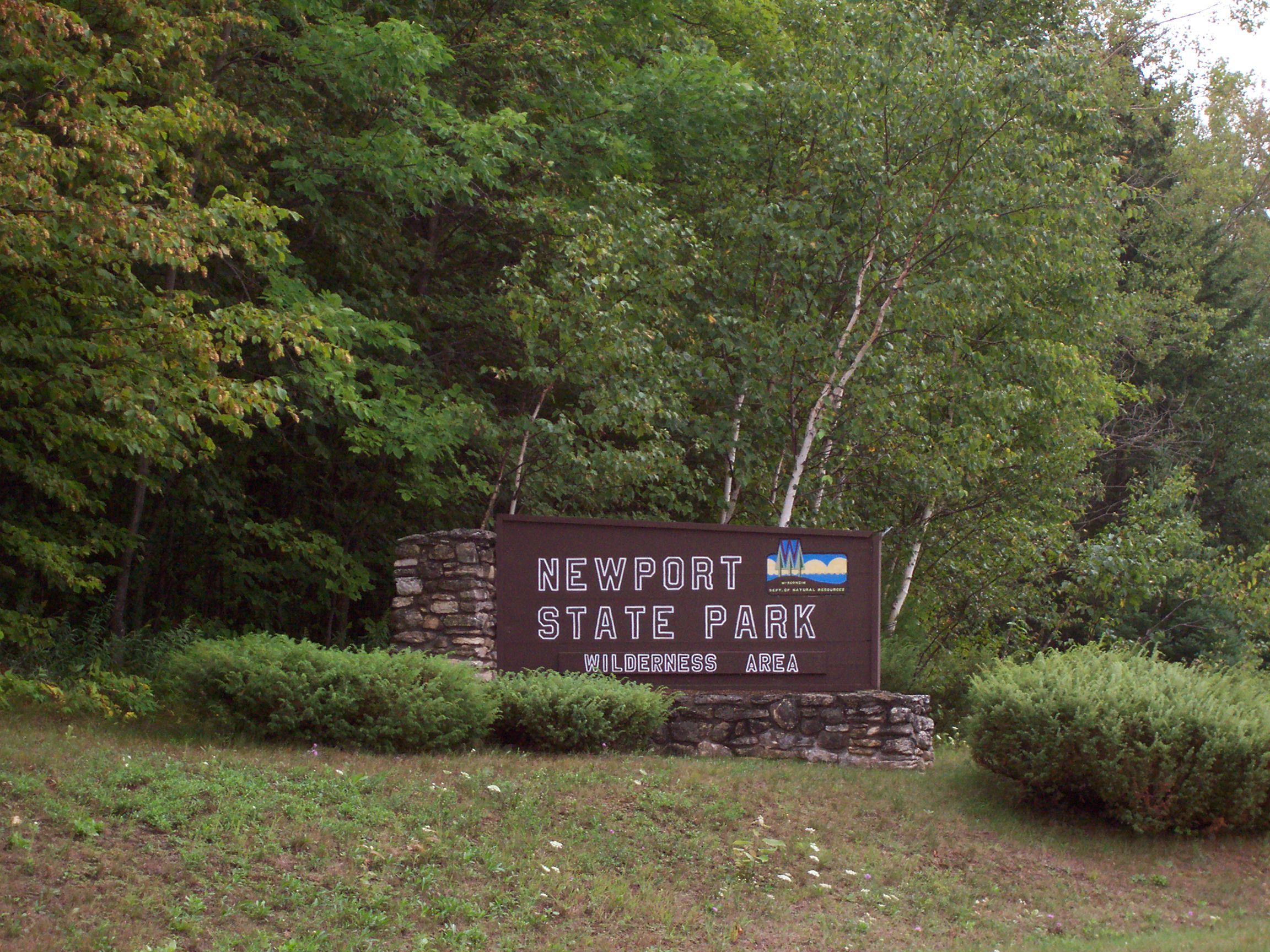

- Location within Wisconsin Location within the United States
- Interactive map of Newport State Park
- Location: Door County, Wisconsin, United States
- Coordinates: 45°14′6″N 86°59′39″W
- Area: 2,373 acres (960 ha)
- Established: 1964
- Administrator: Wisconsin Department of Natural Resources
- Authorized: by the county board on December 11, 1961
- Website: Official website
- Wisconsin State Parks

Newport State Park is a 2,373-acre (960 ha) Wisconsin state park at the tip of Door Peninsula near Europe Lake. Protecting 11 miles (18 km) of shoreline on Lake Michigan, Newport is Wisconsin's only wilderness-designated state park. The park is open year-round and can be accessed via WIS 42.

== History ==
In 1946, the State Planning Board and the Wisconsin Conservation Department recommended the area as a place to develop a park. In 1958 the National Park Service and the Wisconsin Conservation Department also recommended the area. On September 24, 1964, the park was established as Europe Bay State Park. In August 1970, the name was changed to Newport State Park to reflect a park expansion. In 1970 the day use area and entrance road were constructed. Campsites were completed in the summer of 1973. On April 25, 1978 a tract of land between Europe Lake and Europe Bay was added to the park.

In 2017, the International Dark-Sky Association named Newport a Dark Sky Park.

== Air pollution monitor ==
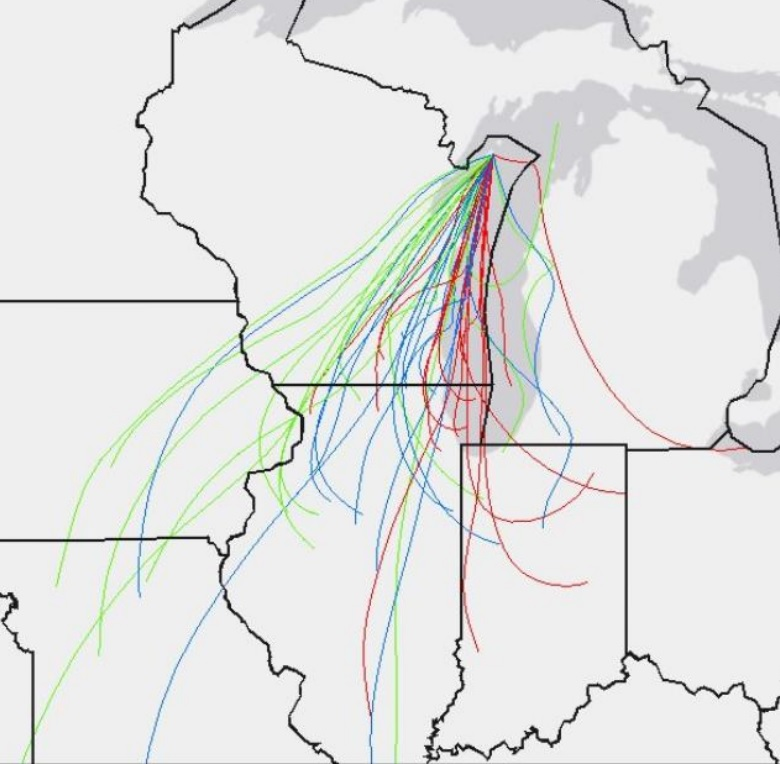
2016 HYSPLIT map

The only public air pollution monitor in the county is located in Newport State Park. Most air pollution reaching the station comes from outside the county. This map shows how air travels to the monitoring station. Because the station is near the shore, only the red lines (which show the lower air currents) meaningfully depict the path of ozone to the monitor. As shown on the map, these lower air currents carry polluted air from major urban areas. Farther inland, however, the air from higher up mixes more, so all color lines are significant when tracing the path of air pollution further inland, and these higher air currents (shown in green and blue) blow in from cleaner, mostly rural areas.

== Climate ==
Europe Bay

Climate chart (precipitation, max. and min. temperature)
J	F	M	A	M	J	J	A	S	O	N	D
66 −4 −9	60 −8 −10	62 0 −4	112 3 0	86 9 3	77 13 10	96 18 16	73 19 16	109 17 14	119 10 7	110 6 5	66 4 1
- █ Average max. and min. temperatures in °C
- █ Precipitation totals in mm
Imperial conversion
J	F	M	A	M	J	J	A	S	O	N	D
2.6 25 16	2.4 18 14	2.4 32 25	4.4 37 32	3.4 48 37	3 55 50	3.8 64 61	2.9 66 61	4.3 63 57	4.7 50 45	4.3 43 41	2.6 39 34
- █ Average max. and min. temperatures in °F
- █ Precipitation totals in inches

The climate of Newport is humid, microthermal with cool summers and with an even monthly precipitation distribution. The climate of the park is modified considerably by its close proximity to Lake Michigan and Green Bay. This is reflected in the fewer number of days with extremely high or low temperatures than are common for that latitude. Spring and early summer are retarded by the surrounding cool water; summers are mild and pleasant. Relatively warm lake water delays the first freeze in fall, and the winters are cold. The lake influence is also seen in higher average cloudiness and lower percentage of sunshine than is found at stations located further away from the lake.

From data compiled in 1974, prevailing winds are from the northwest through the southwest, with the exception of early spring when northeast winds dominate. April and November are the windiest months with averages of 12 miles per hour. Speeds in excess of 60 miles per hour can be expected to occur in seven of ten years. The highest speeds are usually from the west or southwest.

As of figures available in 1974, the percentage of possible sunshine has averaged about 40 percent for November and December and 60 percent or more from May through September. The remaining months average between 50 and 60 percent. The yearly average temperature at Sturgeon Bay is 43.8 °F. The average daily maximum for the month of January is 26.7 °F with the average daily minimum for January at 10.4 °F. The average daily maximum for July is 80.1 °F with an average daily minimum of 57.4 °F.

== Gallery ==
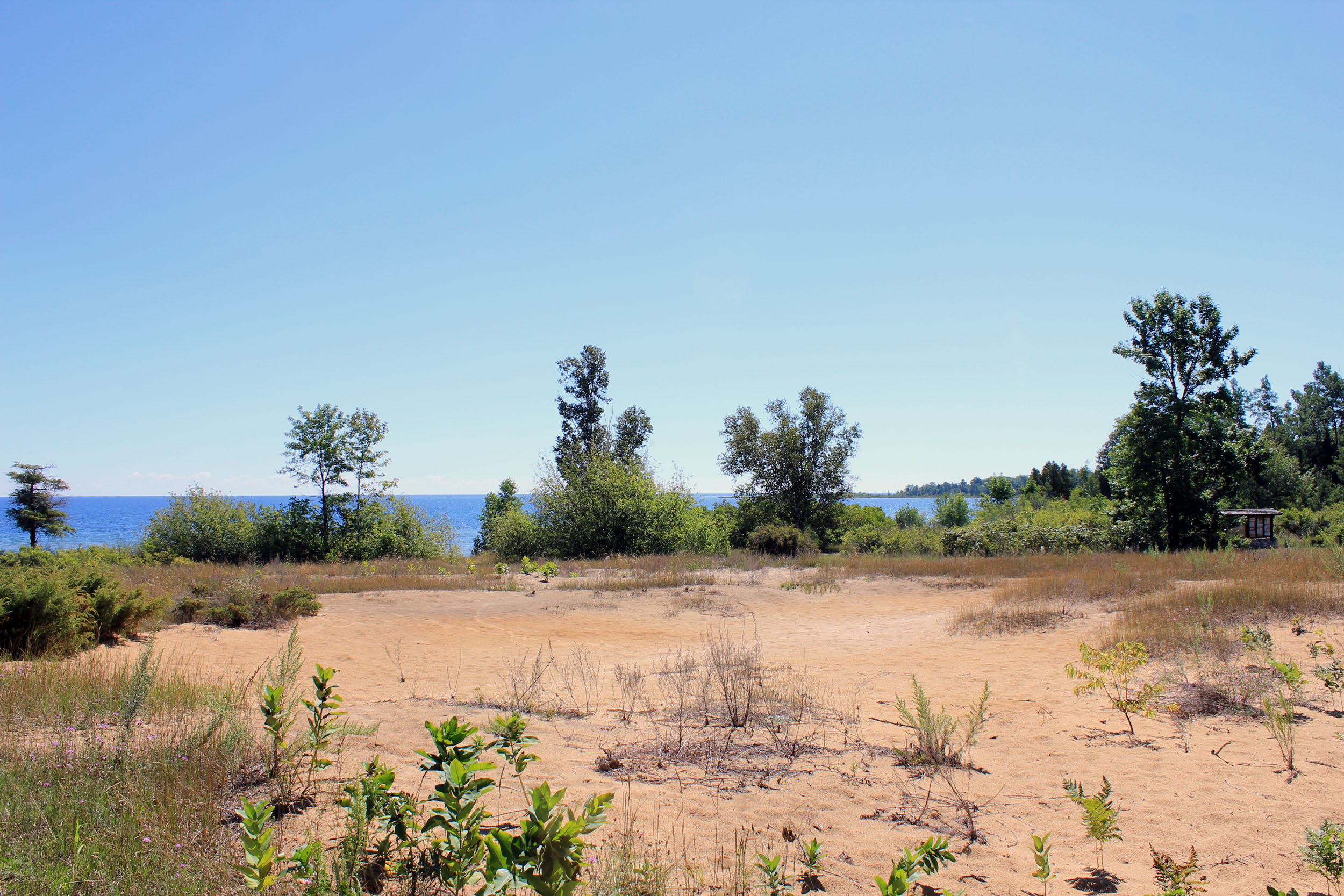
View towards water

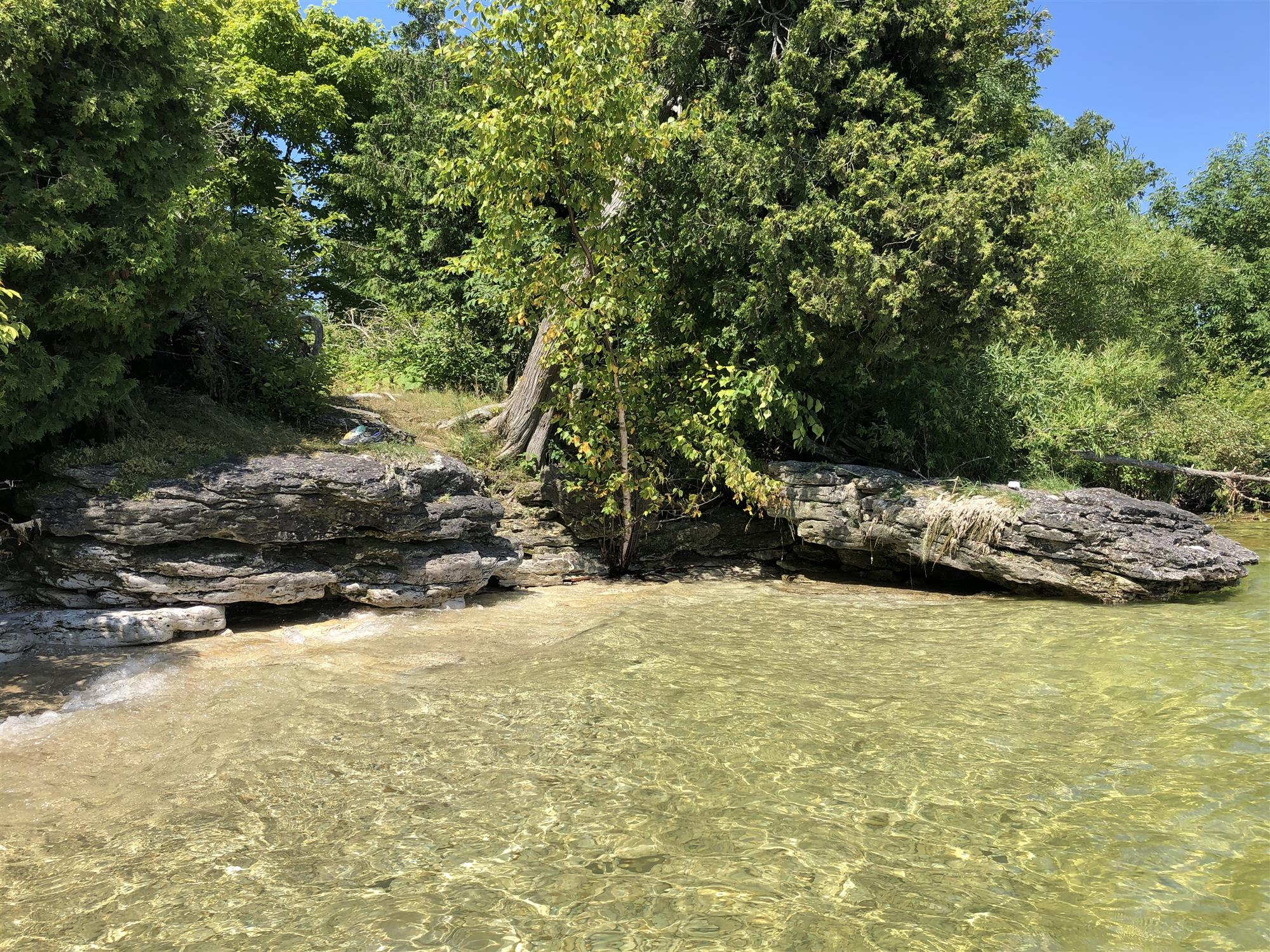
View towards land

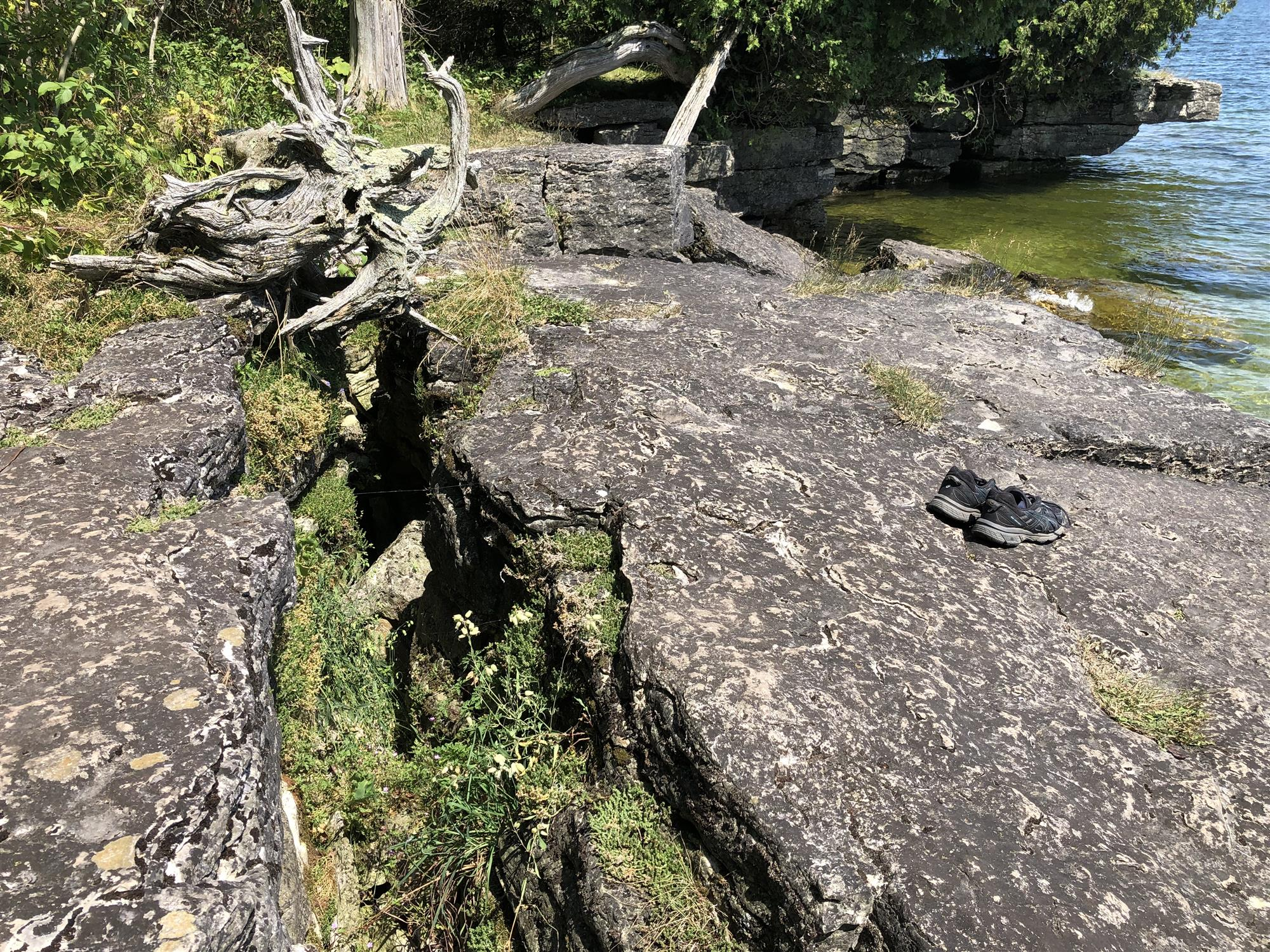
Crevice in the rock, Lynd Point vicinity

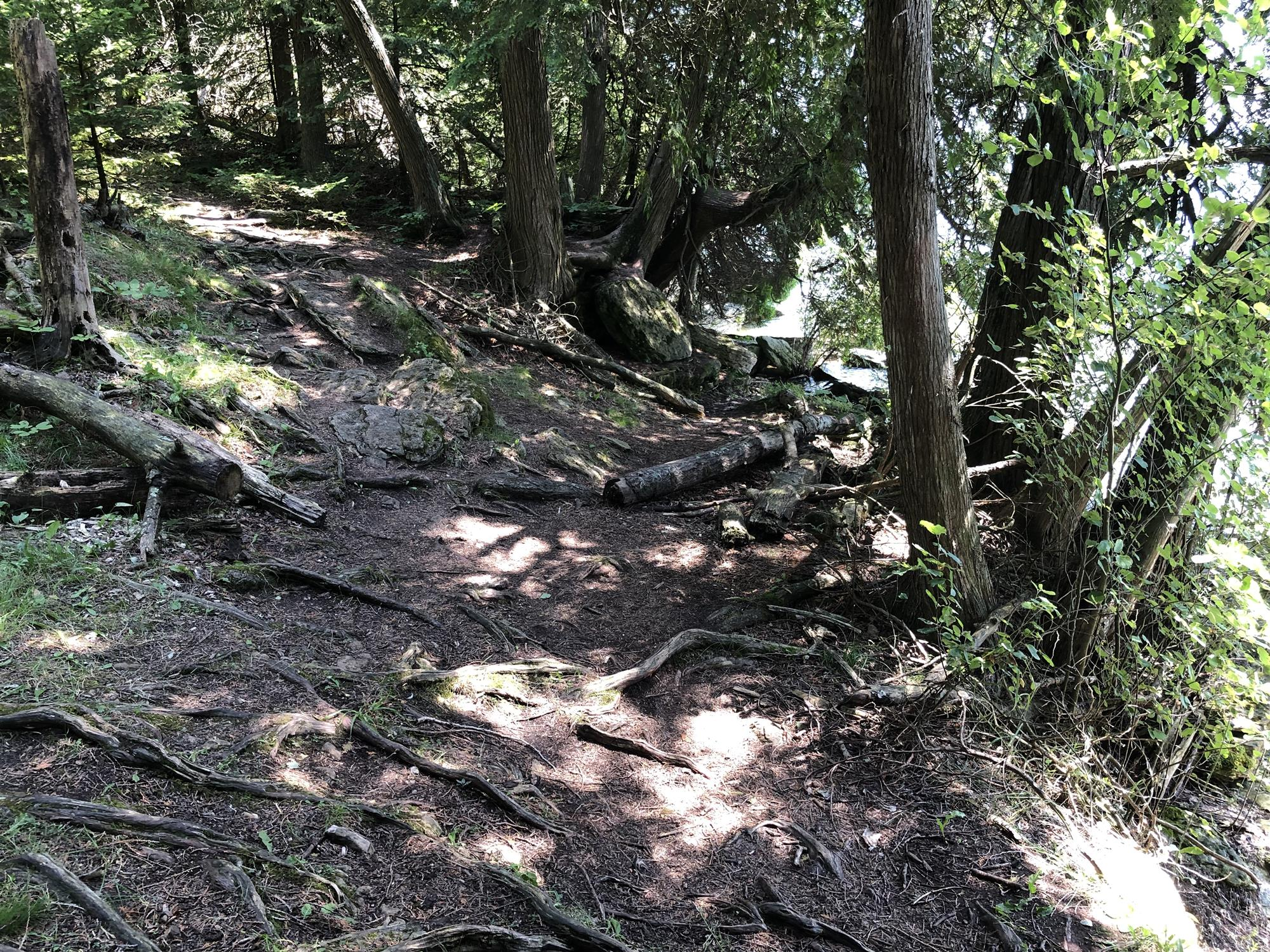
Fern Trail

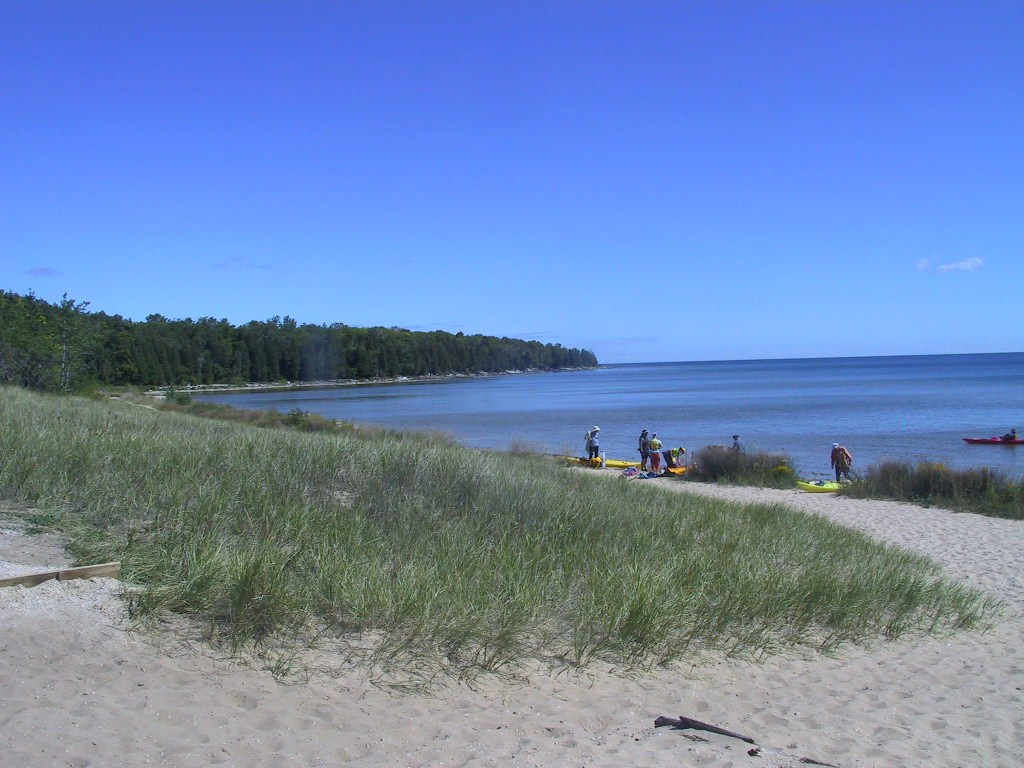
Looking north at the beach with kayakers

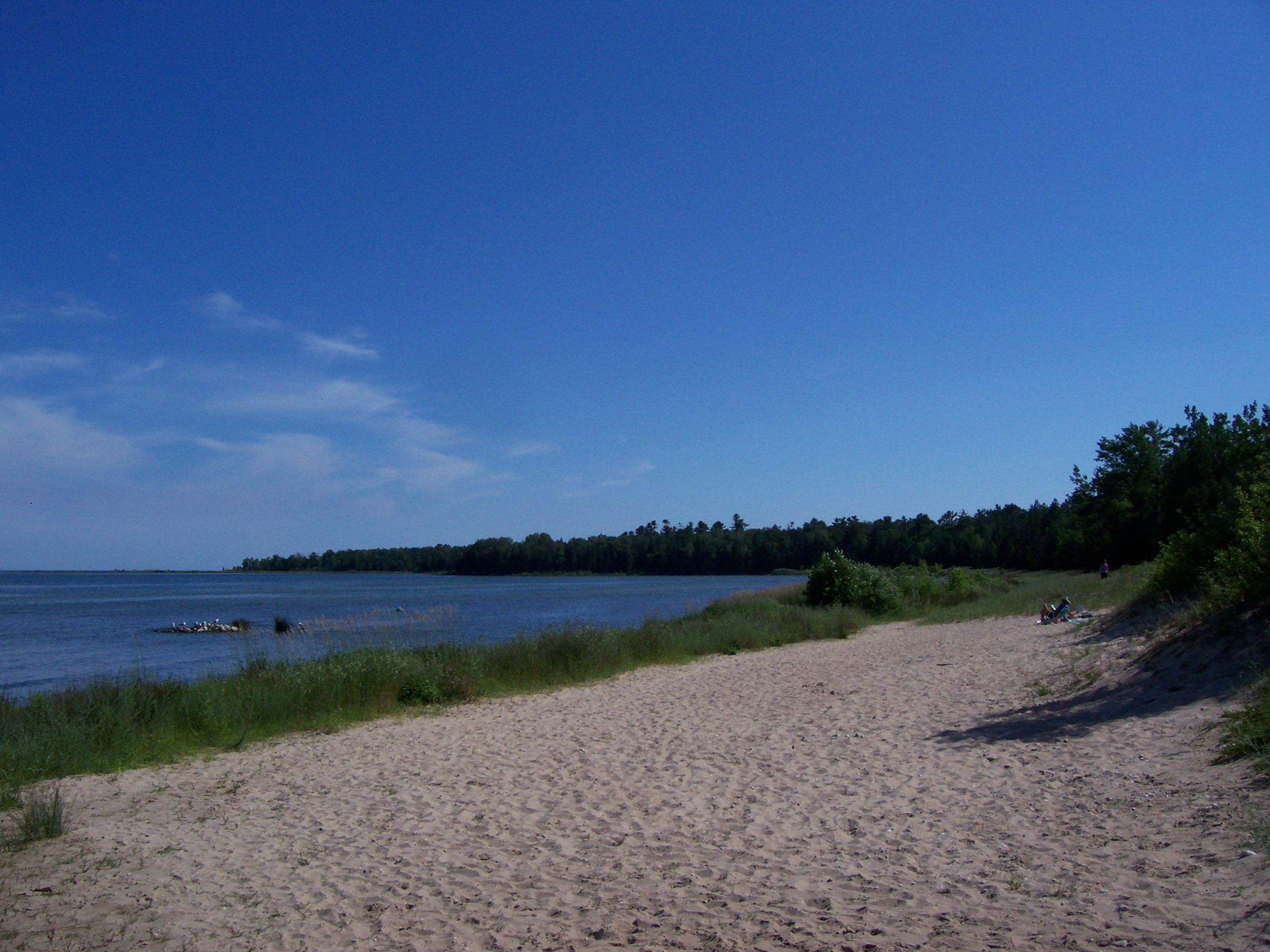
Looking south at the beach

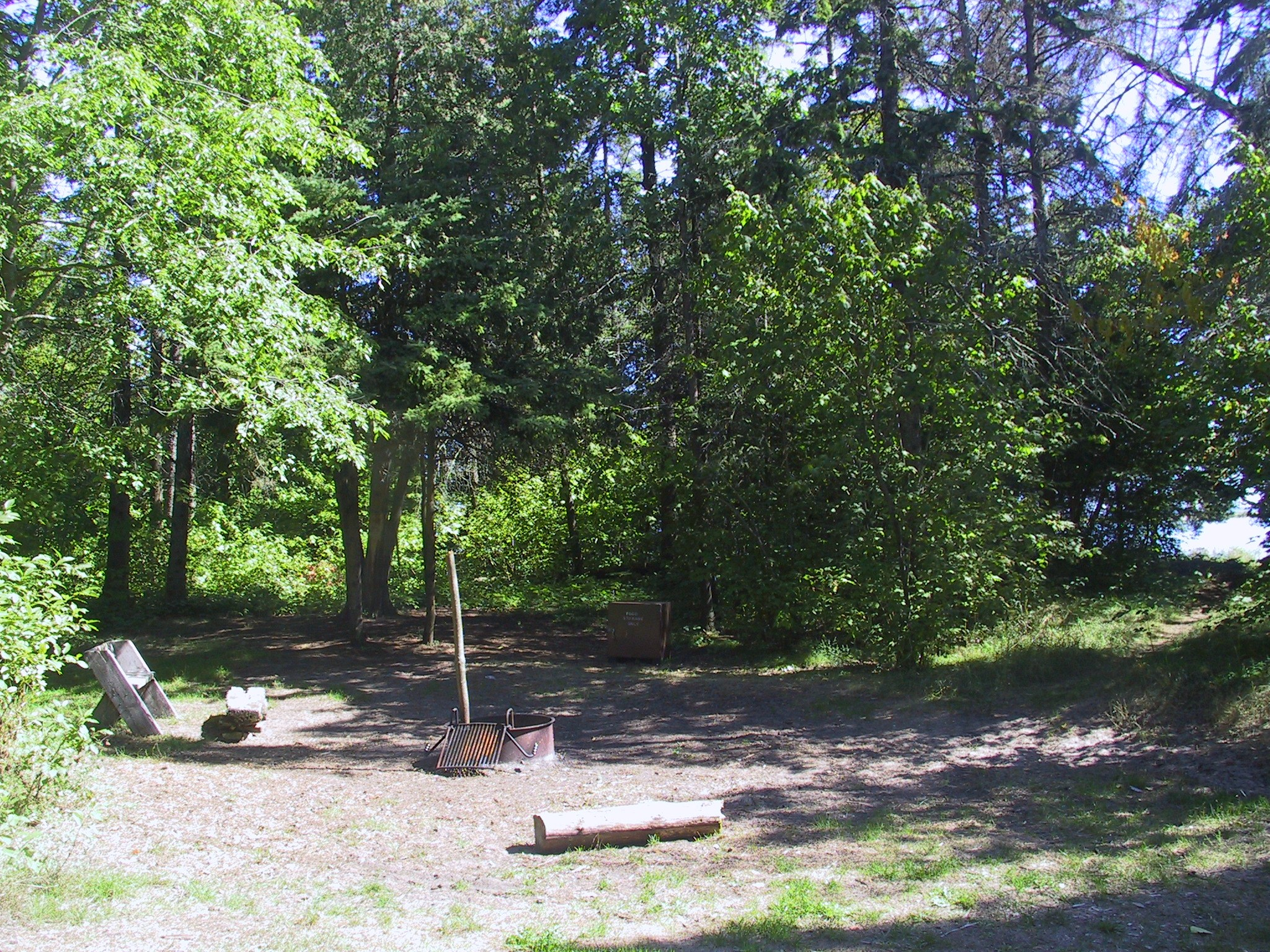
Campsite #3; all campsites require hiking to the site. Norbert Blei commented "I like the idea of Newport State Park, where you have to hike back in to your campsite. There should be some places that you have to earn, to deserve; it can't all be watching the sunset in Ephraim from Wilson's. That's too easy."

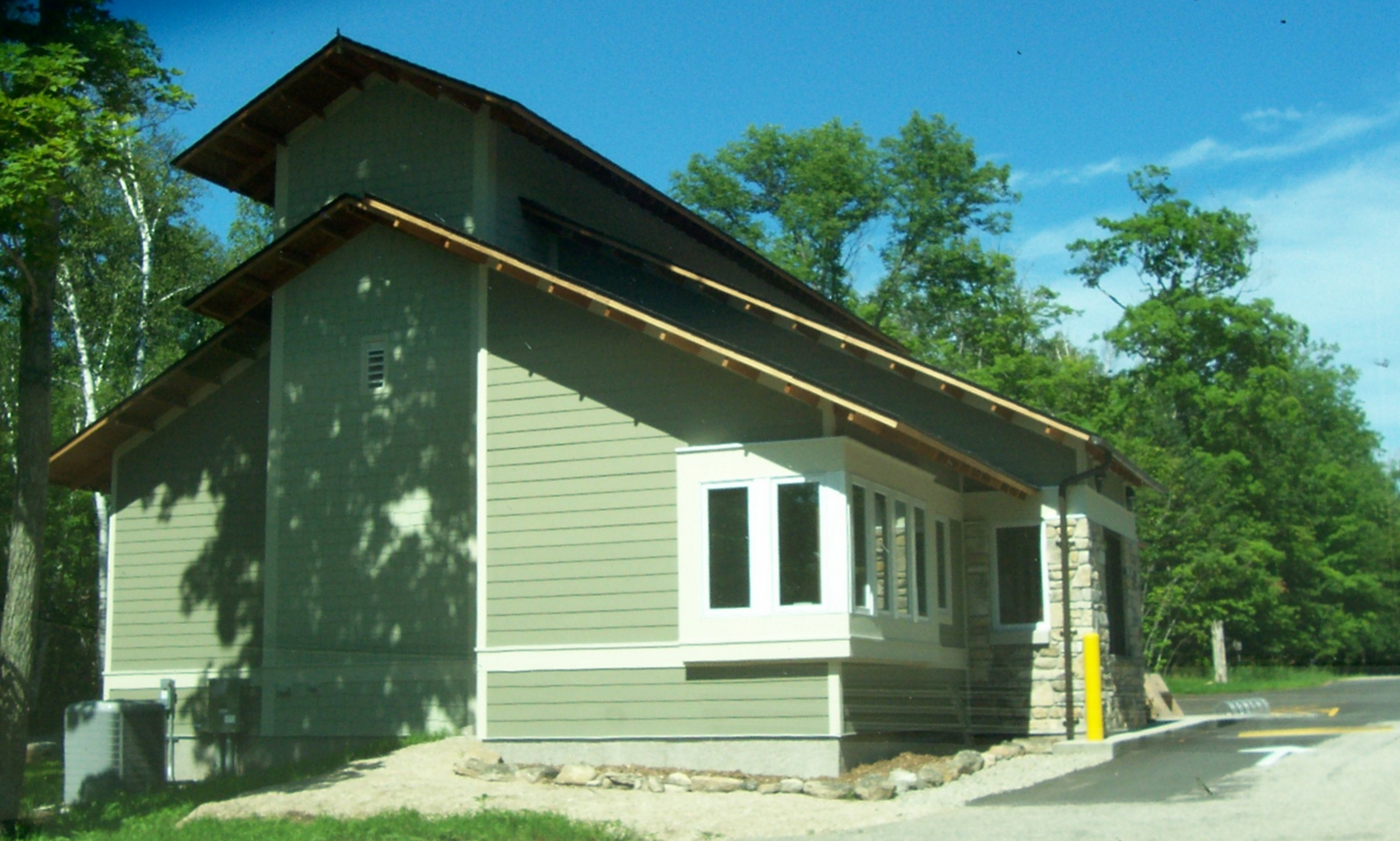
Ranger station

=== Plants ===
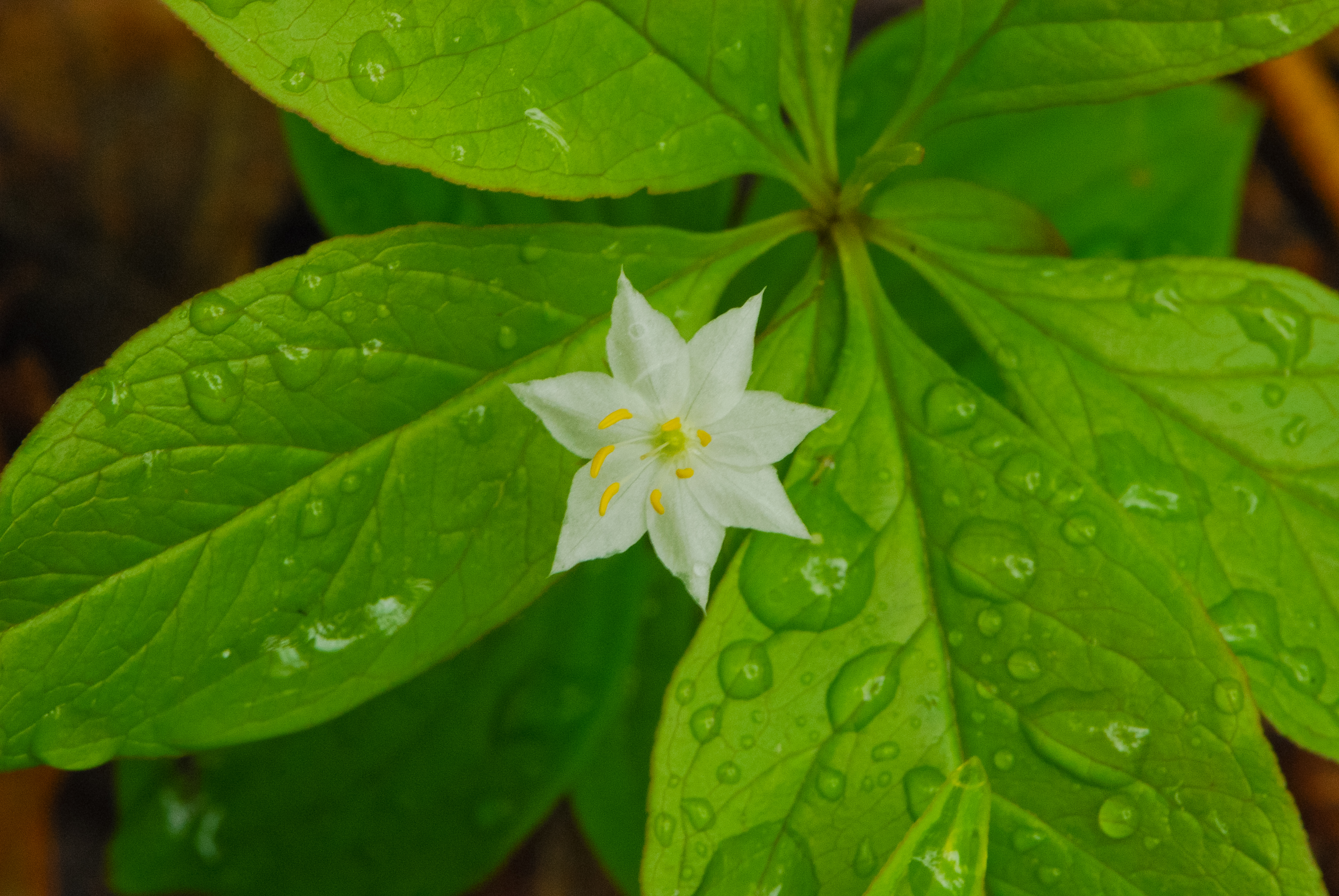
American starflower, Trientalis borealis, synonym Lysimachia borealis, May

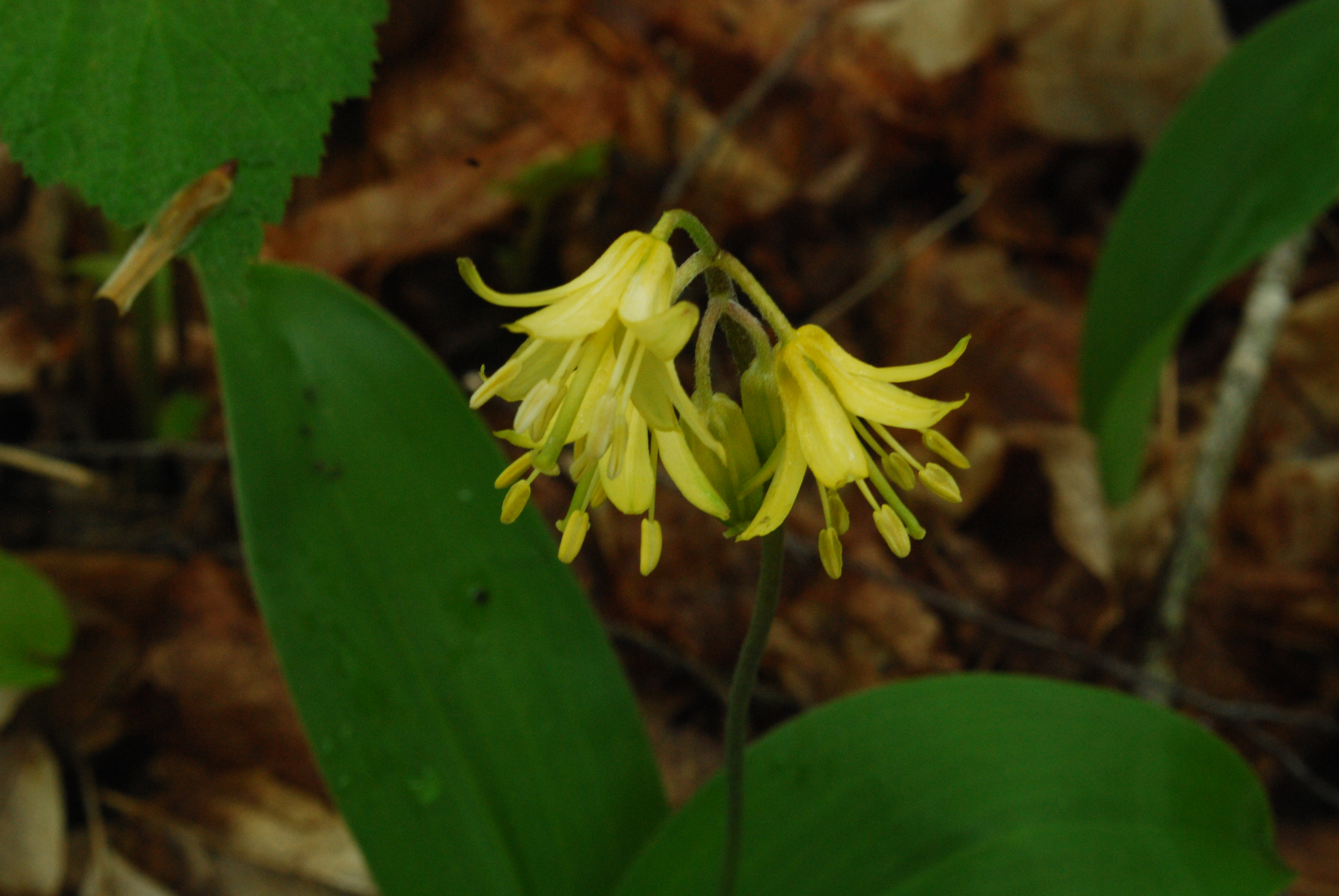
Bluebead, Clintonia borealis, May

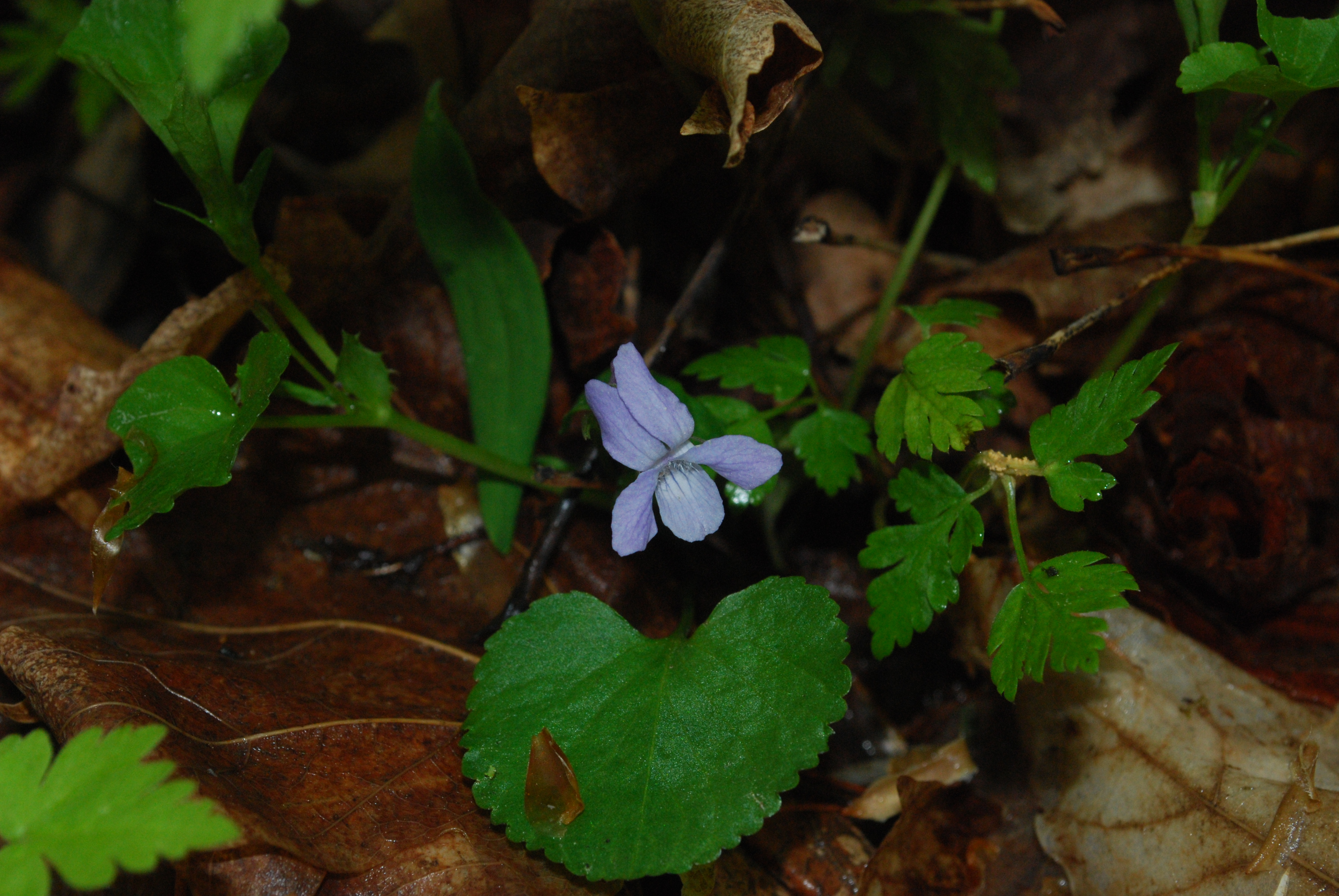
Northern Bog Violet, Viola nephrophylla, May

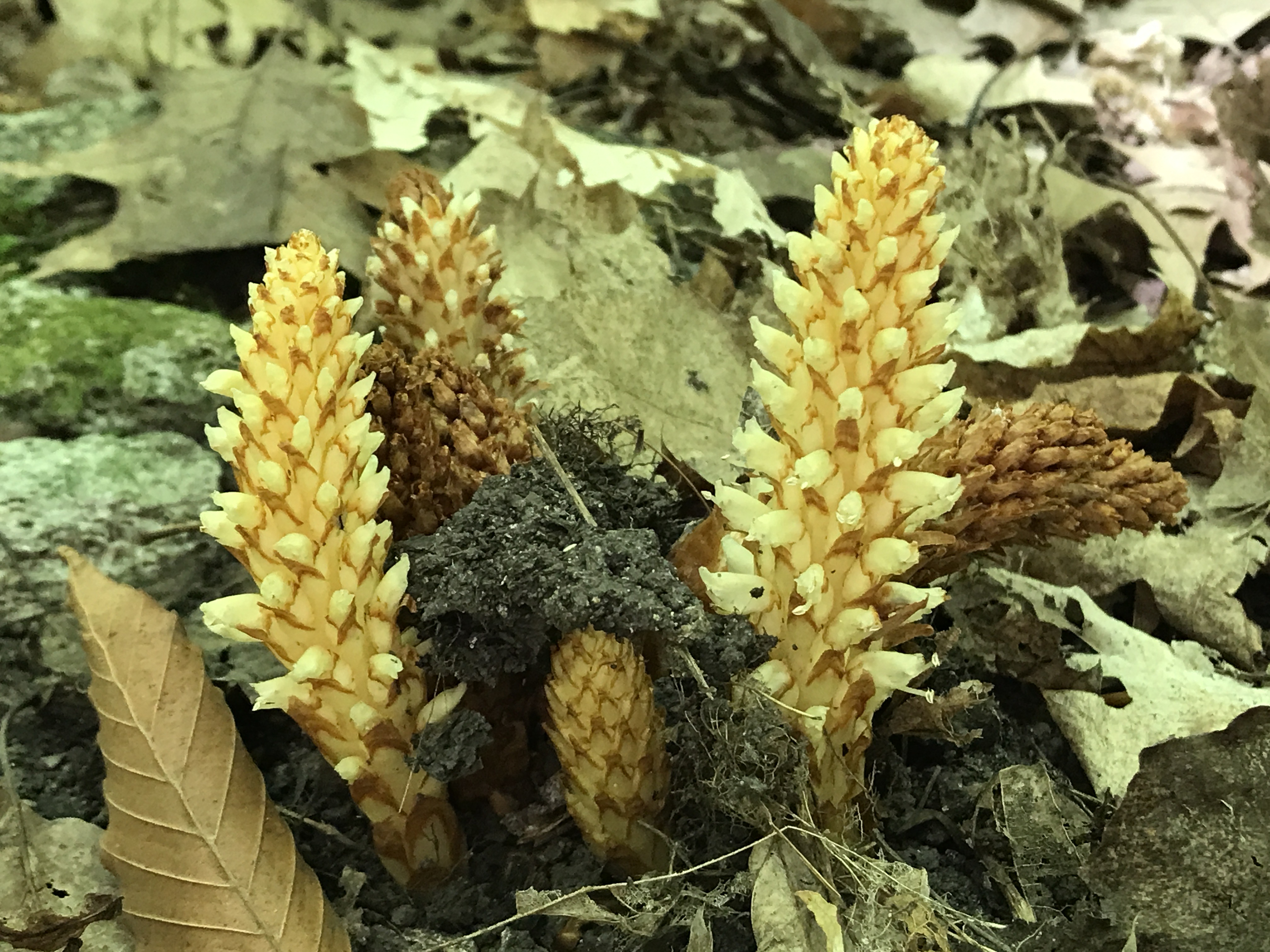
American cancer-root, Conopholis americana, June

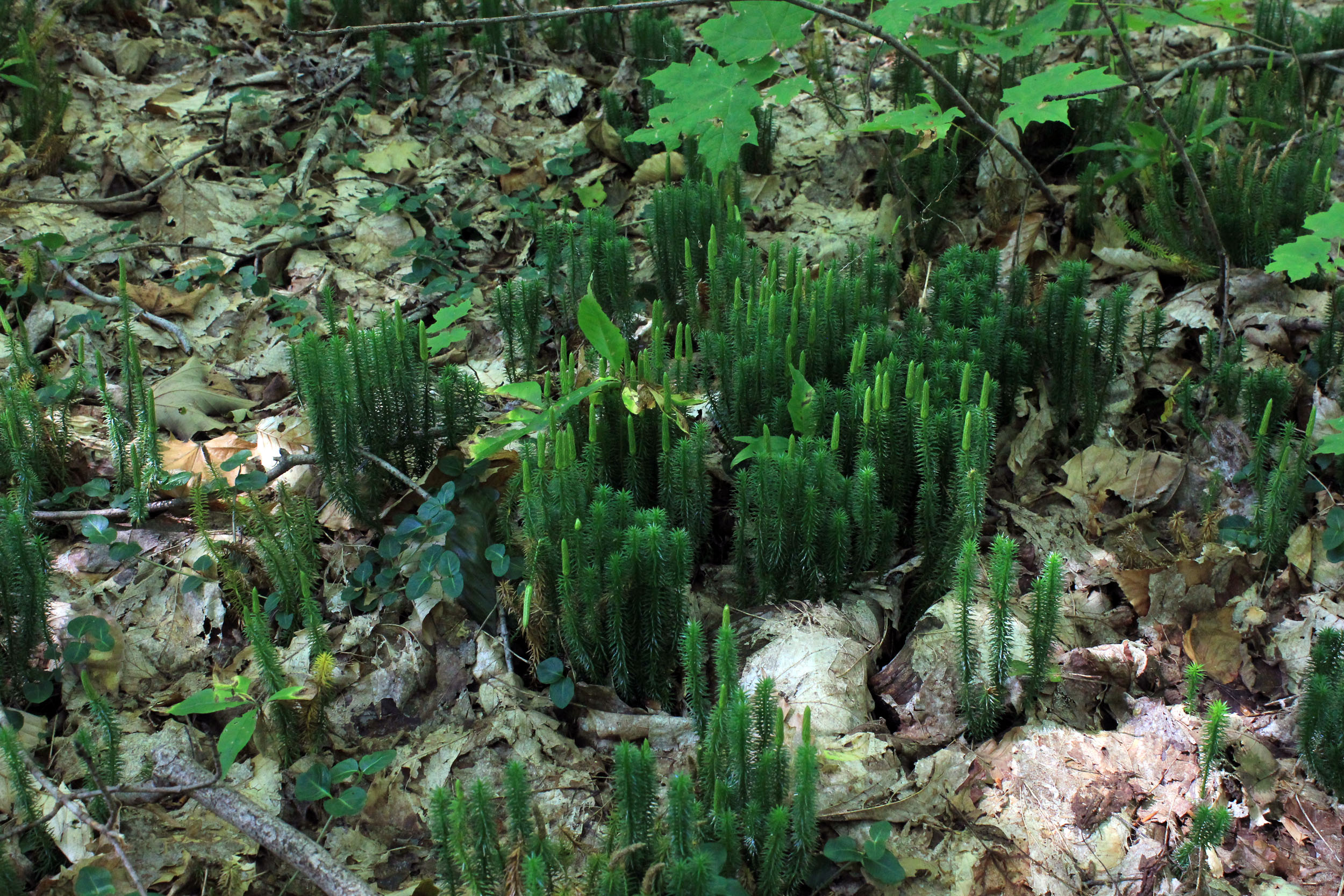
Common club-moss, Spinulum annotinum, synonym Lycopodium annotinum, August

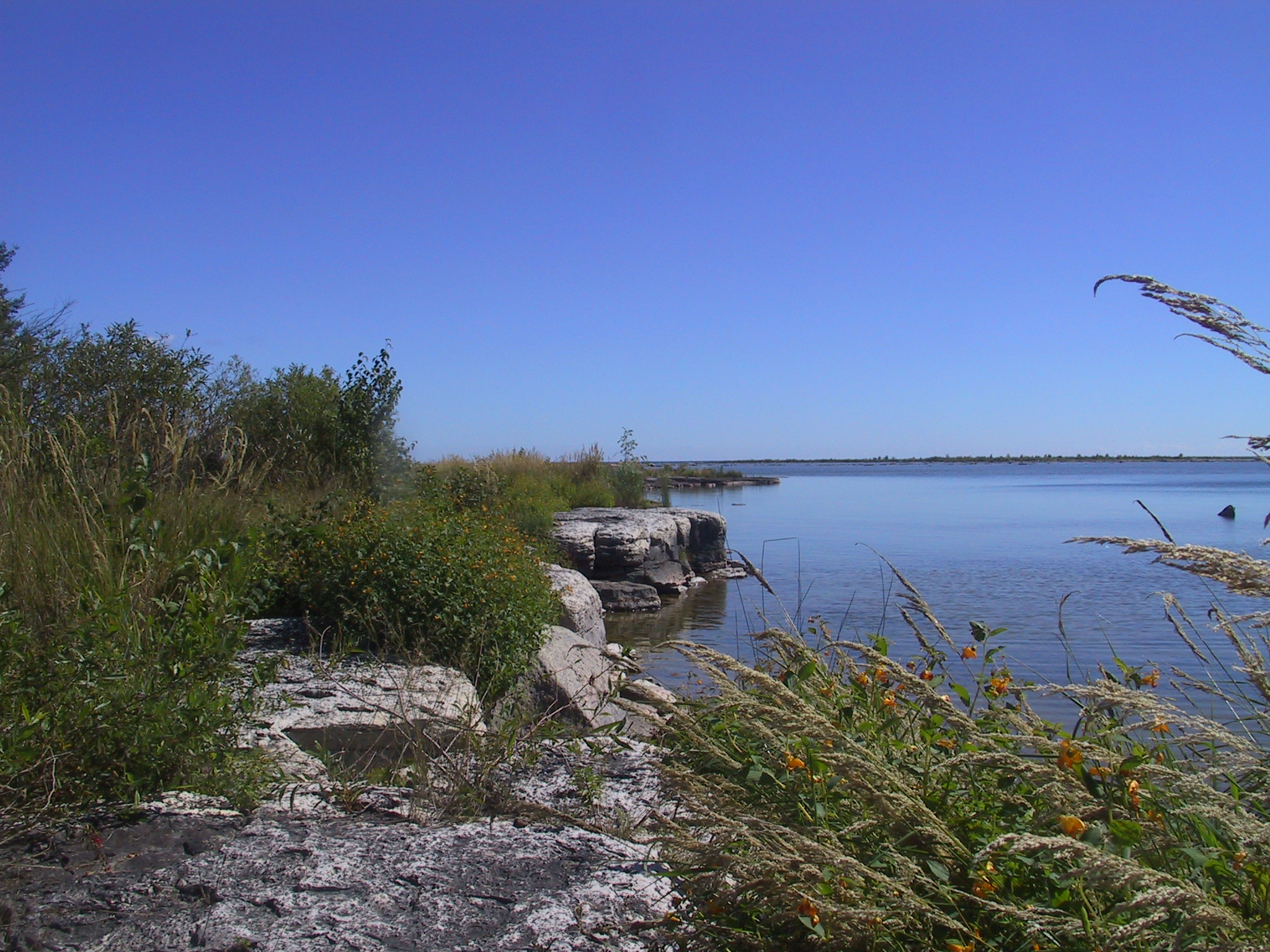
Duck Bay along Newport Trail with reed canary grass (Phalaris arundinacea) and orange jewelweed (Impatiens capensis) flowers, September

=== Aerial views ===
Northern area of the park and surrounding area

Southeastern area of the park and surrounding area

Southwestern area of the park and surrounding area
