= Alexander Gluhovsky =

Alexander B. Gluhovsky
- Education: Moscow State University (M.S.); USSR Academy of Sciences (Ph.D.)
- Known for: Low-order models (LOMs) of atmospheric and climate dynamics Subsampling methodology for time series analysis
- Scientific career
- Fields: Geophysical fluid dynamics Computational statistics
- Workplaces: Purdue University
- Doctoral advisor: Alexander Obukhov

Alexander B. Gluhovsky is an American physicist and statistician known for his contributions to geophysical fluid dynamics, particularly in the development of low-order models for atmospheric and climate phenomena, and for his work in computational statistics applied to time series analysis in the geosciences. He is a professor emeritus at Purdue University (in West Lafayette, Indiana) in the Department of Earth, Atmospheric, and Planetary Sciences, and has a joint appointment in the Department of Statistics as well.

== Education and career ==
Gluhovksy earned his Master of Science (M.S.) in mathematics and statistics from Moscow State University and received his Ph.D. in applied mathematics from the USSR Academy of Sciences in 1973. His doctoral advisor was the prominent Soviet physicist and applied mathematician Alexander Obukhov.

Gluhovsky's association with Purdue University began in 1992 when he joined the Department of Earth and Atmospheric Sciences. In 1996 he joined the Department of Statistics as a visiting professor. In 2007, his position was formalized with joint appointments as an associate professor in both departments. He subsequently achieved the rank of professor and is currently a professor emeritus at the university.

== Research contributions ==
Gluhovsky's research is interdisciplinary, lying at the intersection of nonlinear dynamics, atmospheric science, and statistical inference.

=== Low-order models (LOMs) ===
A major theme of his work is the formulation and analysis of low-order models (LOMs) for complex geophysical flows, such as those related to the atmosphere and climate.

He proposed and analyzed LOMs, often in the form of coupled 3-mode nonlinear systems known in mechanics as Volterra gyrostats (extensions of the Lorenz system). The equations of the gyrostat, which describe the motion of a rigid body containing a spinning rotor, are adapted by Gluhovsky as a basis to construct geophysical fluid dynamics models while ensuring the conservation of energy and other physical properties. This approach has been applied to model phenomena such as Rayleigh-Bénard convection (which is related to mesoscale atomospheric dynamics) and the El Niño-Southern Oscillation (ENSO).

His work connects the dynamic properties of LOMs, such as the existence of coherent structures, to observable features in turbulent flows and atmospheric datasets.

=== Subsampling methodology ===
Gluhovsky is a notable contributor to the field of computational statistics for time series, particularly through the use of resampling methods in weather and climate analysis.

He has championed the use of subsampling (a non-parametric resampling technique) to derive reliable confidence intervals and estimates for statistical parameters of highly complex and non-linear atmospheric and climate time series, where traditional parametric methods often fail due to unmet assumptions.

His work has extended these statistical techniques to estimate higher-order moments (such as skewness and kurtosis) for nonlinear time series, which are essential for characterizing extreme weather events.

Gluhovsky has also published research on the effects of land-use/land-cover change on surface temperature trends, employing statistical methods to separate anthropogenic local effects from larger-scale climate forcing.
