= Surface layer =

Layer of a turbulent fluid affected by interaction with a surface

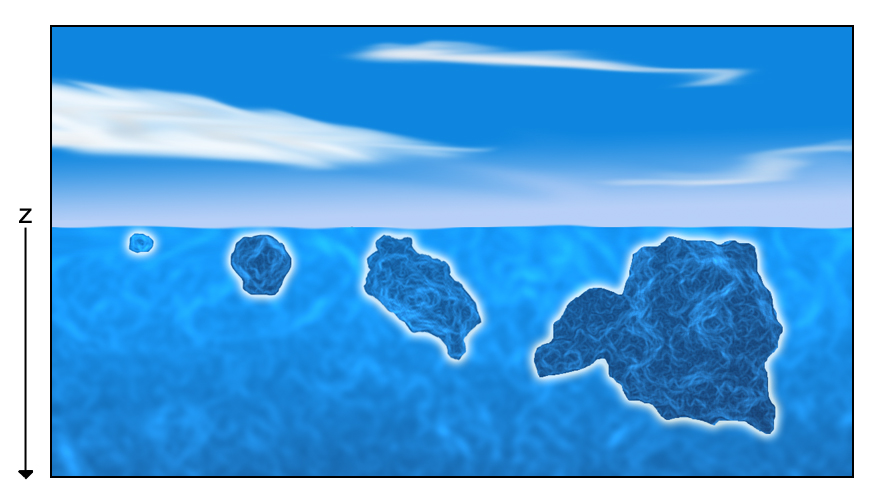
The surface layer is the layer in a fluid where the scale of turbulent eddy is limited by the eddies' proximity to an interface. The objects highlighted in white above are turbulent eddies whose size is constrained by the proximity of the center of each eddy to the surface.

The surface layer is the layer of a turbulent fluid most affected by interaction with a solid surface or the surface separating a gas and a liquid where the characteristics of the turbulence depend on distance from the interface. Surface layers are characterized by large normal gradients of tangential velocity and large concentration gradients of any substances (temperature, moisture, sediments et cetera) transported to or from the interface.

The term boundary layer is used in meteorology and physical oceanography. The atmospheric surface layer is the lowest part of the atmospheric boundary layer (typically the bottom 10% where the log wind profile is valid). The ocean has two surface layers: the benthic, found immediately above the sea floor, and the marine surface layer, at the air-sea interface.

== Mathematical formulation ==
A simple model of the surface layer can be derived by first examining the turbulent momentum flux through a surface. Using Reynolds decomposition to express the horizontal flow in the $x$ direction as the sum of a slowly varying component, $\overline{u}$, and a turbulent component, $u'$,

$u = \overline{u} + u'$

and the vertical flow, $w$, in an analogous fashion,

$$w = \overline{w} + w'$$

we can express the flux of turbulent momentum through a surface, $u_*$, as the time-averaged magnitude of vertical turbulent transport of horizontal turbulent momentum, $u'w'$:

$$u_*^2  = \left|\overline{(u'w')_s} \right|$$.

If the flow is homogeneous within the region, we can set the product of the vertical gradient of the mean horizontal flow and the eddy viscosity coefficient $K_m$ equal to $u_*^2$:

$$K_m\frac{\partial \overline{u}}{\partial z} = u_*^2$$,

where $K_m$ is defined in terms of Prandtl's mixing length hypothesis:

$$K_m = \overline{\xi'^2}\left |\frac{\partial\overline{u}}{\partial z}\right |$$

where $\xi'$ is the mixing length.

We can then express $u_*$ as:

$$\frac{\partial \overline{u}}{\partial z} = \frac{u_*}{\overline{\xi'}}$$.

== Assumptions about the mixing length ==
From the figure above, we can see that the size of a turbulent eddy near the surface is constrained by its proximity to the surface; turbulent eddies centered near the surface cannot be as large as those centered further from the surface. From this consideration, and in neutral conditions, it is reasonable to assume that the mixing length, $\xi'$ is proportional to the eddy's depth in the surface:

$$\xi' = kz$$,

where $z$ is the depth and $k$ is known as the von Kármán constant. Thus the gradient can be integrated to solve for $\overline{u}$:

$$\overline{u} = \frac{u_*}{k}\ln\frac{z}{z_o}$$.

So, we see that the mean flow in the surface layer has a logarithmic relationship with depth. In non-neutral conditions the mixing length is also affected by buoyancy forces and Monin-Obukhov similarity theory is required to describe the horizontal-wind profile.

== Surface layer in oceanography ==
The surface layer is studied in oceanography, as both the wind stress and action of surface waves can cause turbulent mixing necessary for the formation of a surface layer.

The world's oceans are made up of many different water masses. Each have particular temperature and salinity characteristics as a result of the location in which they formed. Once formed at a particular source, a water mass will travel some distance via large-scale ocean circulation. Typically, the flow of water in the ocean is described as turbulent (i.e. it doesn't follow straight lines). Water masses can travel across the ocean as turbulent eddies, or parcels of water usually along constant density (isopycnic) surfaces where the expenditure of energy is smallest. When these turbulent eddies of different water masses interact, they will mix together. With enough mixing, some stable equilibrium is reached and a mixed layer is formed. Turbulent eddies can also be produced from wind stress by the atmosphere on the ocean. This kind of interaction and mixing through buoyancy at the surface of the ocean also plays a role in the formation of a surface mixed layer.

=== Discrepancies with traditional theory ===
The logarithmic flow profile has long been observed in the ocean, but recent, highly sensitive measurements reveal a sublayer within the surface layer in which turbulent eddies are enhanced by the action of surface waves. It is becoming clear that the surface layer of the ocean is only poorly modeled as being up against the "wall" of the air-sea interaction. Observations of turbulence in Lake Ontario reveal under wave-breaking conditions the traditional theory significantly underestimates the production of turbulent kinetic energy within the surface layer.

=== Diurnal cycle ===
The depth of the surface mixed layer is affected by solar insolation and thus is related to the diurnal cycle. After nighttime convection over the ocean, the turbulent surface layer is found to completely decay and restratify. The decay is caused by the decrease in solar insolation, divergence of turbulent flux and relaxation of lateral gradients. During the nighttime, the surface ocean cools because the atmospheric circulation is reduced due to the change in heat with the setting of the sun each day. Cooler water is less buoyant and will sink. This buoyancy effect causes water masses to be transported to lower depths even lower those reached during daytime. During the following daytime, water at depth is restratified or un-mixed because of the warming of the sea surface and buoyancy driving the warmed water upward. The entire cycle will be repeated and the water will be mixed during the following nighttime.

In general, the surface mixed layer only occupies the first 100 meters of the ocean but can reach 150 m in the end of winter. The diurnal cycle does not change the depth of the mixed layer significantly relative to the seasonal cycle which produces much larger changes in sea surface temperature and buoyancy. With several vertical profiles, one can estimate the depth of the mixed layer by assigning a set temperature or density difference in water between surface and deep ocean observations – this is known as the “threshold method”.

However, this diurnal cycle does not have the same effect in midlatitudes as it does at tropical latitudes. Tropical regions are less likely than midlatitude regions to have a mixed layer dependent on diurnal temperature changes. One study explored diurnal variability of the mixed layer depth in the Western Equatorial Pacific Ocean. Results suggested no appreciable change in the mixed layer depth with the time of day. The significant precipitation in this tropical area would lead to further stratification of the mixed layer. Another study which instead focused on the Central Equatorial Pacific Ocean found a tendency for increased depths of the mixed layer during nighttime. The extratropical or midlatitude mixed layer was shown in one study to be more affected by diurnal variability than the results of the two tropical ocean studies. Over a 15-day study period in Australia, the diurnal mixed layer cycle repeated in a consistent manner with decaying turbulence throughout the day.

== See also ==
- Boundary layer
- Mixed layer
- Density
- Salinity
- Sea surface microlayer
