= ADMS 3 =

Atmospheric pollution dispersion model

The ADMS 3 (Atmospheric Dispersion Modelling System) is an advanced atmospheric pollution dispersion model for calculating concentrations of atmospheric pollutants emitted both continuously from point, line, volume and area sources, or intermittently from point sources. It was developed by Cambridge Environmental Research Consultants (CERC) of the UK in collaboration with the UK Meteorological Office, National Power plc (now INNOGY Holdings plc) and the University of Surrey. The first version of ADMS was released in 1993. The version of the ADMS model discussed on this page is version 3 and was released in February 1999. It runs on Microsoft Windows. The current release, ADMS 5 Service Pack 1, was released in April 2013 with a number of additional features.

== Features and capabilities of the ADMS 3 ==
The model includes algorithms which take into account: downwash effects of nearby buildings within the path of the dispersing pollution plume; effects of complex terrain; effects of coastline locations; wet deposition, gravitational settling and dry deposition; short term fluctuations in pollutant concentration; chemical reactions; radioactive decay and gamma-dose; pollution plume rise as a function of distance; jets and directional releases; averaging time ranging from very short to annual; and condensed plume visibility. The system also includes a meteorological data input preprocessor.

The model is capable of simulating passive or buoyant continuous plumes as well as short duration puff releases. It characterizes the atmospheric turbulence by two parameters, the boundary layer depth and the Monin-Obukhov length, rather the single parameter Pasquill class.

ADMS 3 can simultaneously model up to 100 emission sources, of which:

- up to 100 may be point or jet sources
- up to 6 may be line, area or volume sources
- 1 may be a line source

The latest version (ADMS 5) allows up to 300 sources. Within that limit, up to 300 point sources, 30 line sources, 30 area sources and 30 volume sources may be modelled.

The performance of the model has been evaluated against various measured dispersion data sets.

== Users of the ADMS 3 ==
The users of ADMS 3 include:

- Governmental regulatory authorities including the UK Health and Safety Executive (HSE)
- Environment Agency of England and Wales
- Over 130 individual company licence holders in the UK
- Scottish Environment Protection Agency (SEPA) in Scotland
- Northern Ireland Environment Agency
- Governmental organisations including the Food Standards Agency (UK)
- Users in other European countries, Asia, Australia and the Middle East
- Accepted by the US Environmental Protection Agency as an "Alternative" model

== See also ==
- List of atmospheric dispersion models
- UK Dispersion Modelling Bureau
- UK Atmospheric Dispersion Modelling Liaison Committee
