= Valerian Tatarskii =

Soviet and American physicist

Valerian Illarionovich Tatarskii
- Валериа́н Илларио́нович Тата́рский
- Born: February 6, 1929; Moscow, Soviet Union
- Died: October 3, 2020 (aged 91)
- Citizenship: Soviet, American
- Education: Lomonosov Moscow State University
- Known for: The theory of wave propagation in random media
- Awards: USSR State Prize (1990); Max Born Award (1994)
- Scientific career
- Fields: Wave propagation in random media, Atmospheric physics, Atmospheric optics
- Workplaces: Russian Academy of Sciences (Institute of Atmospheric Physics); National Oceanic and Atmospheric Administration (Environmental Technology Laboratory)
- Doctoral advisor: Alexander Obukhov

Valerian Illarionovich Tatarskii (Russian: Валериа́н Илларио́нович Тата́рский) was a Soviet and American physicist who worked on the theory of wave propagation in random media (WPRM). His theoretical work provided the statistical framework for understanding how turbulence in the atmosphere and ocean affects light, radio, and acoustic waves, used in fields such as adaptive optics, remote sensing, and free-space optical communications.

== Early life and career ==
Tatarskii was born on 6 February 1929 in Moscow. Following his graduation from Lomonosov Moscow State University in 1952, he joined the Institute of Atmospheric Physics (IAP) of the USSR Academy of Sciences in Moscow. His early research on turbulence modeling was influenced by the work of Soviet scientists like Andrey Kolmogorov and Alexander Obukhov (who served as Tatarskii's doctoral advisor).

He completed his Candidate of Sciences (a Ph.D. equivalent) thesis in 1957 and his Doctor of Sciences (a "higher doctorate") thesis in 1965. Both focused on the statistical theory of wave propagation in turbulent media.

== Scientific contributions ==
Tatarskii's contribution was the creation of a comprehensive, rigorous statistical theory explaining the effects of random, small-scale fluctuations (turbulence) in the atmosphere on propagating waves.

=== Monographs ===
- Wave Propagation in a Turbulent Medium. New York: McGraw-Hill. (Original Russian edition published 1959; English edition 1961).
- The Effects of the Turbulent Atmosphere on Wave Propagation. Jerusalem: Israel Program for Scientific Translations. (Original Russian edition published 1967; English edition 1971).

These books developed the mathematical tools required to characterize wave distortion, including phase shift and intensity fluctuations (scintillation).

=== Theoretical methods ===
Tatarskii worked on several theoretical methods for solving WPRM problems:

- Method of Smooth Perturbations (Rytov approximation).
- He adapted the formal mathematical apparatus of Feynman diagrams from quantum field theory to solve the higher-order moment equations for wave fields in strongly random media.
- He introduced a Markov approximation to simplify the description of wave scattering, enabling the treatment of strong intensity fluctuations.
- Tatarskii applied Richard Feynman's path integral formulation to the parabolic wave equation, offering an alternative approach to problems of strong turbulence.

== Later career and recognition ==
In 1990, Tatarskii emigrated to the United States, where he joined the National Oceanic and Atmospheric Administration (NOAA) Environmental Technology Laboratory (ETL) in Boulder, Colorado. His work there focused on the application of statistical wave theory to remote sensing and atmospheric sounding.

He was a founding member and associate editor of the international journal Waves in Random Media.

=== Honors and awards ===
- 1976: Corresponding Member of the USSR Academy of Sciences
- 1990: USSR State Prize
- 1991: Fellow of the Optical Society of America (OSA)
- 1994: Max Born Award from the OSA, cited for "pioneering and fundamental theoretical contributions to the statistical theory of wave propagation in the atmosphere."
- 1994: Foreign Associate of the National Academy of Engineering (NAE) of the USA

== Selected publications ==
- Tatarskii, V. I., & Zavorotny, V. U. (1980). Strong Fluctuations in the Intensity of Waves Propagating in Random Media. Progress in Optics, 18, 204–256.
- Tatarskii, V. I., & Galkin, I. G. (1997). The Application of Path Integrals to Wave Propagation in Random Media. Waves in Random Media, 7(1), 1–25.

== Death ==
Valerian Tatarskii died on 3 October 2020, at the age of 91.
