= Andrei Monin =

Soviet-Russian physicist, mathematician, and oceanographer (1921–2007)

- Андрей Сергеевич Монин
- Born: Andrei Sergeyevich Monin; July 2, 1921; Moscow, RSFSR
- Died: September 22, 2007 (aged 86); Moscow, Russia
- Education: Lomonosov Moscow State University
- Known for: Monin–Obukhov length
- Awards: Alexander Friedmann Prize
- Scientific career
- Fields: Atmospheric physics, turbulence
- Workplaces: Shirshov Institute of Oceanology; Moscow Institute of Physics and Technology
- Doctoral advisor: Andrey Kolmogorov

Andrei Sergeyevich Monin (Russian: Андрей Сергеевич Монин or А. С. Монин; 2 July 1921 – 22 September 2007) was a Soviet and Russian geophysicist, mathematician, and oceanographer. Monin was known for his contributions to statistical theory of turbulence and atmospheric physics. He served as the director of the P.P. Shirshov Institute of Oceanology of the Academy of Sciences of the Soviet Union. He was instrumental in developing the Shirshov Institute into one of the largest scientific centers for ocean and earth science studies.

The Monin–Obukhov similarity theory and the Monin–Obukhov length are named after Monin and Russian Academician Alexander Obukhov.

== Life and work ==
Monin was born in Moscow to Sergei Aleksandrovich Monin, an assistant professor of the Moscow Pedagogical Institute. He joined the Mechanical and Mathematical Faculty of the Lomonosov Moscow State University in 1938 and received his bachelor's degree in 1942. Monin then enrolled for the postgraduate programme in the same university.

Military career

In 1943, Monin was called up for military service in the ranks of the Red Army where he was asked to join the military courses of weather forecasters organized at the Higher Hydrometeorological Institute of the Red Army. He joined in the rank of lieutenant and sent to the 3rd Baltic Front where he was section leader of a frontal meteorological station. He served in the army during the whole military campaign from the liberation of Pskov until the liberation of Riga. In 1945, Monin was attached to the Central Institute of Weather Forecasting of the Red Army. In 1946, he was demobilized and worked as a research fellow at the Central Institute of Weather Forecasting.

Education and early career

In 1946, Monin came back to Moscow State University to continue his post-graduate programme under the direct guidance of Academician Andrey Kolmogorov who prepared and defended his Candidate's thesis on the theory of atmospheric turbulence. In 1951 Monin started to work at the Atmospheric Physics Department at Geophysical Institute of the Academy of Sciences of the Soviet Union, which later recognized as the Atmospheric Physics Institute (presently The Obhukov Institute of Atmospheric Physics). At the latter Institute he was a senior scientist, Head of a department and a scientific consultant. In 1956 he defended his Doctor's thesis on the theory of turbulent diffusion.

== Awards and honors ==
A. S. Monin had received many honors and medals: among them are:

- Foreign member of the American Academy of Arts and Sciences, 1973.
- Foreign member of the United States National Academy of Sciences, 1976.*Honorary Doctor of the University of Gothenburg, Sweden, 1986.
- Academician of the Russian Academy of Natural Sciences, 1991.
- USSR State Prize, 1980.
- Yuly Shokalsky Prize, 1986.
- Alexander Friedmann Prize by Russian Academy of Sciences in 1993.

== Books authored ==
Monin was a prolific author of scientific works on various topics, including theory of turbulence, atmospheric physics, planetology, and meteorology. He was the author of about 620 scientific publications, including 24 monographs and the ten-volume "Okeanologia". Almost all of his books have been translated into foreign languages.

Noted for its clarity as well as its comprehensive treatment, the book "Statistical Fluid Mechanics: Mechanics of Turbulence", co-authored with Akiva Yaglom, is considered to be a classic work on theory of turbulence. Science while reviewing this book had observed: "If ever a book on turbulence could be called definitive, it is this book by two of Russia's most eminent and productive scientists in turbulence, oceanography, and atmospheric physics."

- Monin, A. S. (1972). Weather forecasting as a problem in physics. Cambridge, MA: MIT Press. ISBN 978-0-262-13083-7.
- Monin, Andreĭ Sergeevich (1974). Earth's Rotation and Climate. Radok-Radhakrishna.
- Monin, Andrej S.; Kamenkovič, Vladimir M.; Kort, Vladimir G. (1977). Variability of the oceans. A Wiley-Interscience Publication. New York: Wiley. ISBN 978-0-471-61328-2.
- Monin, A. S.; Ozmidov, R. V. (1985). Turbulence in the Ocean. Dordrecht: Springer Netherlands. doi:10.1007/978-94-009-5217-1. ISBN 978-94-010-8808-4.
- Monin, A. S. (1986). An Introduction to the Theory of Climate. Dordrecht: Springer Netherlands. doi:10.1007/978-94-009-4506-7. ISBN 978-94-010-8507-6.
- Kamenkovich, V. M.; Koshlyakov, M. N.; Monin, A. S. (1986). Synoptic Eddies in the Ocean. Dordrecht: Springer Netherlands. doi:10.1007/978-94-009-4502-9. ISBN 978-94-010-8506-9.
- Monin, A. S. (1990). Theoretical Geophysical Fluid Dynamics. Dordrecht: Springer Netherlands. doi:10.1007/978-94-009-1880-1. ISBN 978-94-010-7339-4.
- Monin, Andrej S.; Jaglom, Akiva M. (2007). Statistical fluid mechanics: mechanics of turbulence. Vol. 1 (English ed.). Mineola, NY: Dover Publ. ISBN 978-0-486-45883-0.
- Monin, Andrej S.; Jaglom, Akiva M. (2007). Statistical fluid mechanics: mechanics of turbulence. Vol. 2 (English ed.). Mineola, NY: Dover Publ. ISBN 978-0-486-45891-5.
