= Alexander Obukhov =

Russian geophysicist (1918–1989)

- Born: Alexander Mikhailovich Obukhov; May 5, 1918; Saratov, Russian SFSR
- Died: December 3, 1989 (aged 71); Moscow, Russian SFSR, Soviet Union
- Citizenship: Russian
- Education: Saratov University; Moscow State University
- Known for: Boundary layer meteorology Monin–Obukhov length
- Scientific career
- Fields: Meteorology, turbulence
- Workplaces: Russian Academy of Sciences
- Doctoral advisor: A. N. Kolmogorov
- Doctoral students: Alexander Gluhovsky; Valerian Tatarskii

Alexander Mikhailovich Obukhov (Russian: Алекса́ндр Миха́йлович Обу́хов; 5 May 1918 – 3 December 1989) was a Soviet and Russian geophysicist and applied mathematician known for his contributions to statistical theory of turbulence and atmospheric physics. He was one of the founders of modern boundary layer meteorology. He served as the Head of the theoretical department at Sternberg Astronomical Institute, a division of Moscow State University.

Obukhov's 1946 fundamental paper on a universal length scale for exchange processes in the surface layer was the basis for the derivation of the Monin–Obukhov similarity theory in 1954. The Monin–Obukhov similarity theory and the Monin–Obukhov length are named after him and Russian Academician Andrei Monin.

== Early life and education ==
Obukhov was born on 5 May 1918 in Saratov. He finished high school in 1934 but could not write the entrance examination of Saratov University because he was too young. Therefore, he spent a year at Saratov Meteorological Observatory. Obukhov wrote and published his first paper in 1939. It was based on the work he had done at Saratov Meteorological Observatory. In 1935 Obukhov joined Saratov University where he studied mathematics and science. Obhukhov did his Ph.D. at the Moscow State University, under the supervision of Andrey Kolmogorov. During his graduate studies with Kolmogorov, he also worked at the Institute for Theoretical Geophysics of the USSR Academy of Sciences, recently created by Otto Schmidt.

In 1941 Obukhov independently discovered the –5/3 law for the turbulent energy spectrum. According to Uriel Frisch, this discription of energy distribution in a turbulent flow is a key element of Kolmogorov's 1941 theory of turbulence (see Sec. 6.5 of Frisch's book). In 1941 Obukhov also worked on a law of turbulent diffusion, first discovered empirically by Lewis Fry Richardson in 1922, and called the Richardson-Obukhov law in the Russian literature. Obukhov defended his doctoral dissertation in 1947, titled "Statistical Description of Continuous Fields".

== Later work ==
In 1956, Obukhov founded the Institute of Atmospheric Physics of the Academy of Sciences of the Soviet Union, which he directed until his death. He was elected a corresponding member in 1953, and then a full member in 1970, of the USSR Academy of Sciences. In the mid-1970s, he founded, and served as chief editor of, the journal Izvestiya, Atmospheric and Oceanic Physics. He also spent over 20 years teaching on the physics faculty of Moscow University. He was an honorary member of the Royal Meteorological Society and American Geophysical Union, president (1963-1967) of the International Association of Meteorology and Atmospheric Physics, and an editorial board member of the journals Tellus and Dynamics of Atmospheres and Oceans. He was also awarded the Alexander Friedmann Prize, the Badge of Honor, the Order of the October Revolution, and the Order of the Labor Red Star.

According to the obituary published in the journal he founded, Obukhov "took justifiable pride in the fact that he had been able to participate in the formation of a new field of science, geophysical hydrodynamics. He was one of those who introduced the fundamental concept of potential vorticity into hydrodynamics and promoted its adoption into dynamic meteorology, thus anticipating current trends in the development of science. The synoptic scale and prognostic equation that bear his name have established themselves permanently in science. A. M. Obukhov made an extremely significant contribution to the development of modern nonlinear physics, and he was the first to become aware of the possibility of applying the theory of dynamic systems and methods of nonlinear mechanics to the description fo the motion of continua."
