= Useful conversions and formulas for air dispersion modeling =

Various governmental agencies involved with environmental protection and with occupational safety and health have promulgated regulations limiting the allowable concentrations of gaseous pollutants in the ambient air or in emissions to the ambient air. Such regulations involve a number of different expressions of concentration. Some express the concentrations as ppmv and some express the concentrations as mg/m^{3}, while others require adjusting or correcting the concentrations to reference conditions of moisture content, oxygen content or carbon dioxide content. This article presents a set of useful conversions and formulas for air dispersion modeling of atmospheric pollutants and for complying with the various regulations as to how to express the concentrations obtained by such modeling.

== Converting air pollutant concentrations ==
The conversion equations depend on the temperature at which the conversion is wanted (usually about 20 to 25 degrees Celsius). At an ambient air pressure of 1 atmosphere (101.325 kPa), the general equation is:

$$\mathrm{ppmv} = \mathrm{mg}/\mathrm{m}^3\cdot \frac{(0.08205\cdot T)}{M}$$

and for the reverse conversion:

$$\mathrm{mg}/\mathrm{m}^3 = \mathrm{ppmv}\cdot \frac{M}{(0.08205\cdot T)}$$

where:
ppmv	= air pollutant concentration, in parts per million by volume
mg/m^{3}	= milligrams of pollutant per cubic meter of air
$T$	= atmospheric temperature in kelvins = 273.15 + °C
0.08205	= Universal Gas Law constant in atm·l/(mol·K)
$M$	= molecular weight of the air pollutant (dimensionless)

Notes:

- Pollution regulations in the United States typically reference their pollutant limits to an ambient temperature of 20 to 25 °C as noted above. In most other nations, the reference ambient temperature for pollutant limits may be 0 °C or other values.
- 1 percent by volume = 10,000 ppmv (i.e., parts per million by volume).
- atm = absolute atmospheric pressure in atmospheres
- mol = gram mole

== Correcting concentrations for altitude ==
Atmospheric pollutant concentrations expressed as mass per unit volume of atmospheric air (e.g., mg/m^{3}, μg/m^{3}, etc.) at sea level will decrease with increasing altitude because the atmospheric pressure decreases with increasing altitude.

The change of atmospheric pressure with altitude can be obtained from this equation:

$$P_a=0.9877^a$$

Given an atmospheric pollutant concentration at an atmospheric pressure of 1 atmosphere (i.e., at sea level altitude), the concentration at other altitudes can be obtained from this equation:

$$C_a = C\cdot 0.9877^a$$

where:
$a$	= altitude, in hundreds of meters
$P$	= atmospheric pressure at altitude $a$, in atmospheres
$C$	= Concentration at sea level altitude, in mass per unit volume
$C_a$	= Concentration at altitude $a$, in mass per unit volume

As an example, given a concentration of 260 mg/m^{3} at sea level, calculate the equivalent concentration at an altitude of 1,800 meters:

C_{a} = 260 × 0.9877^{18} = 208 mg/m^{3} at 1,800 meters altitude

== Standard conditions for gas volumes ==
A normal cubic meter (Nm^{3} ) is the metric expression of gas volume at standard conditions and it is usually (but not always) defined as being measured at 0 °C and 1 atmosphere of pressure.

A standard cubic foot (scf) is the USA expression of gas volume at standard conditions and it is often (but not always) defined as being measured at 60 °F and 1 atmosphere of pressure. There are other definitions of standard gas conditions used in the USA besides 60 °F and 1 atmosphere.

That being understood:

1 Nm^{3} of any gas (measured at 0 °C and 1 atmosphere of absolute pressure) equals 37.326 scf of that gas (measured at 60 °F and 1 atmosphere of absolute pressure).

1 kmol of any ideal gas equals 22.414 Nm^{3} of that gas at 0 °C and 1 atmosphere of absolute pressure ... and 1 lbmol of any ideal gas equals 379.482 scf of that gas at 60 °F and 1 atmosphere of absolute pressure.

Notes:

- kmol = kilomole or kilogram mole
- lbmol = pound mole

== Wind speed conversion factors ==
Meteorological data includes wind speeds which may be expressed as statute miles per hour, knots, or meters per second. Here are the conversion factors for those various expressions of wind speed:

1 m/s = 2.237 statute mile/h = 1.944 knots
1 knot = 1.151 statute mile/h = 0.514 m/s
1 statute mile/h = 0.869 knots = 0.447 m/s

Note:

- 1 statute mile = 5,280 feet = 1,609 meters

== Correcting for reference conditions ==
Many environmental protection agencies have issued regulations that limit the concentration of pollutants in gaseous emissions and define the reference conditions applicable to those concentration limits. For example, such a regulation might limit the concentration of NOx to 55 ppmv in a dry combustion exhaust gas corrected to 3 volume percent O_{2}. As another example, a regulation might limit the concentration of particulate matter to 0.1 grain per standard cubic foot (i.e., scf) of dry exhaust gas corrected to 12 volume percent CO_{2}.

Environmental agencies in the USA often denote a standard cubic foot of dry gas as "dscf" or as "scfd". Likewise, a standard cubic meter of dry gas is often denoted as "dscm" or "scmd" (again, by environmental agencies in the USA).

=== Correcting to a dry basis ===
If a gaseous emission sample is analyzed and found to contain water vapor and a pollutant concentration of say 40 ppmv, then 40 ppmv should be designated as the "wet basis" pollutant concentration. The following equation can be used to correct the measured "wet basis" concentration to a "dry basis" concentration:

$$dry\;basis\;concentration = (wet\;basis\;concentration)/(1-w)$$

where:
$w$	= fraction of the emitted exhaust gas, by volume, which is water vapor

Thus, a wet basis concentration of 40 ppmv in a gas having 10 volume percent water vapor would have a dry basis concentration = 40 ÷ ( 1 - 0.10 ) = 44.44 ppmv.

=== Correcting to a reference oxygen content ===
The following equation can be used to correct a measured pollutant concentration in an emitted gas (containing a measured O_{2} content) to an equivalent pollutant concentration in an emitted gas containing a specified reference amount of O_{2}:

$$C_r = C_m\cdot\frac{(20.9-r)}{(20.9-m)}$$

where:
$C_r$	= corrected concentration in a dry gas having a specified reference volume % O_{2} = $r$
$C_m$	= measured concentration in a dry gas having a measured volume % O_{2} = $m$

Thus, a measured NO_{x} concentration of 45 ppmv (dry basis) in a gas having 5 volume % O_{2} is
45 × ( 20.9 - 3 ) ÷ ( 20.9 - 5 ) = 50.7 ppmv (dry basis) of NO_{x} when corrected to a gas having a specified reference O_{2} content of 3 volume %.

=== Correcting to a reference carbon dioxide content ===
The following equation can be used to correct a measured pollutant concentration in an emitted gas (containing a measured CO_{2} content) to an equivalent pollutant concentration in an emitted gas containing a specified reference amount of CO_{2}:

$$C_r = C_m\cdot\frac {r}{m}$$

where:
$C_r$	= corrected concentration in a dry gas having a specified reference volume % CO_{2} = $r$
$C_m$	= measured concentration in a dry gas having a measured volume % CO_{2} = $m$

Thus, a measured particulates concentration of 0.1 grain per dscf in a gas that has 8 volume % CO_{2} is
0.1 × ( 12 ÷ 8 ) = 0.15 grain per dscf when corrected to a gas having a specified reference CO_{2} content of 12 volume %.

Notes:

- Although ppmv and grains per dscf have been used in the above examples, concentrations such as ppbv (i.e., parts per billion by volume), volume percent, grams per dscm and many others may also be used.
- 1 percent by volume = 10,000 ppmv (i.e., parts per million by volume).
- Care must be taken with the concentrations expressed as ppbv to differentiate between the British billion which is 10^{12} and the USA billion which is 10^{9}.

== See also ==
- Standard conditions of temperature and pressure
- Units conversion by factor-label
- Atmospheric dispersion modeling
- Roadway air dispersion modeling
- Bibliography of atmospheric dispersion modeling
- Accidental release source terms
- Choked flow
