= John S. Gulliver =

American environmental engineer

- Occupations: Environmental engineer and academic

Academic background
- Education: University of California, Santa Barbara (B.S., Chemical Engineering); University of Minnesota (M.S., Civil Engineering; Ph.D., Civil Engineering)

Academic work
- Institutions: University of Minnesota

John S. Gulliver is an American environmental engineer and academic. He is an emeritus professor at the University of Minnesota.

Gulliver's research interests include hydraulic structures, environmental engineering, chemical transport, and environmental fluid mechanics. He has received the Rickey Medal and the Hunter T. Rouse Award and Lecture from the American Society of Civil Engineers (ASCE) and has been an ASCE Fellow since 1993.

== Education ==
Gulliver received a B.S. in Chemical Engineering from the University of California, Santa Barbara, in 1974 and an M.S. in Civil Engineering from the University of Minnesota in 1977. He completed his Ph.D. in Civil Engineering from the University of Minnesota in 1980.

== Career ==
Gulliver's academic career included being appointed an assistant professor at the University of Minnesota from 1981 to 1987. He was promoted to associate professor there in 1987 and remained in the post until 1996. Between 1996 and 2021, he was appointed professor at the University of Minnesota. Since 2021, he has held the title of emeritus professor there. At the University of Minnesota, he was also appointed head of the Department of Civil Engineering from 1998 to 2007 and director of the St. Anthony Falls Laboratory from 2003 to 2004.

As a chemical and civil engineer, Gulliver has held appointments at the Federal Power Commission, State of Minnesota.

== Research ==
In research related to chemical transport in environmental systems, Gulliver, along with colleagues, found that the levels of perfluoro-octane sulfonate (PFOS) and perfluorooctanoate (PFOA) in soil decrease quickly in an upwind direction from the point of contamination. Based on this, they suggested that wind can be used as a pathway for off-site transportation of perfluoroalkyl substances (PFAS's). In related work, he proposed that PFOS and PFOA can be eliminated from drinking water sources by using ferric chloride and alum as a coagulant. In his research on stormwater management, he showed that urban runoff can lead to a range of different environmental problems, such as the endangerment of stream habitat, stream channelization, and decline in water quality. It was also suggested that green infrastructure practices are effective when implemented with defined targets and parameters, as well as by consistent evaluation. Moreover, his work also emphasized that green infrastructure can retain stormwater, minimize runoff, and provide ecological advantages.

Gulliver is one of the patent holders on the SAFL Baffle, a device that retains sediment in a stormwater sump for later cleaning. He also co-developed an iron-enhanced sand filter (IESF) and demonstrated that an average of 88% phosphate could be retained for approximately 200m treated depth after using IESFs as a stormwater treatment method. Along with colleagues, he developed the MPD Infiltrometer, a device for measuring surface infiltration rates, whose accuracy in measuring saturated hydraulic conductivity (K_{sat}) and Green-Ampt wetting-front suction head was verified by numerical analysis and laboratory experiments involving falling head barrels filled with various types of sand.

== Awards and honors ==
- 1993 – Fellow, American Society of Civil Engineers
- 2003 – Rickey Medal, American Society of Civil Engineers
- 2020 – Hunter T. Rouse Award and Lecture, American Society of Civil Engineers

== Bibliography ==
=== Books ===
- Gulliver, John S.; Arndt, Roger E. A. (1991). Hydropower Engineering Handbook. New York: McGraw-Hill. ISBN 978-0070251939.
- Gulliver, John S. (2007). Introduction to Chemical Transport in the Environment. Cambridge University Press. ISBN 978-0521858502.
- Gulliver, John S. (2012). Transport and Fate of Chemicals in the Environment: Selected Entries from the Encyclopedia of Sustainability Science and Technology. New York, NY: Springer. ISBN 978-1461457305.
- Erickson, Andrew J.; Weiss, Peter T.; Gulliver, John S. (2013). Optimizing Stormwater Treatment Practices: A Handbook of Assessment and Maintenance (1st ed.). New York: Springer. ISBN 978-1461446231.

=== Selected articles ===
- Gulliver, John S.; Thene, John R.; Rindels, Alan J. (1990). "Indexing Gas Transfer in Self-Aerated Flows". Journal of Environmental Engineering. 116 (3): 503–523. doi:10.1061/(ASCE)0733-9372(1990)116:3(503).
- Kayhanian, Masoud; Fruchtman, Boaz D.; Gulliver, John S.; Montanaro, Comasia; Ranieri, Ezio; Wuertz, Stefan (2012). "Review of highway runoff characteristics: Comparative analysis and universal implications". Water Research. 46 (20): 6609–6624. Bibcode:2012WatRe..46.6609K. doi:10.1016/j.watres.2012.07.026. PMID 22959661.
- Xiao, Feng; Simcik, Matt F.; Gulliver, John S. (2013). "Mechanisms for removal of perfluorooctane sulfonate (PFOS) and perfluorooctanoate (PFOA) from drinking water by conventional and enhanced coagulation". Water Research. 47 (1): 49–56. Bibcode:2013WatRe..47...49X. doi:10.1016/j.watres.2012.09.024. PMID 23123052.
- LeFevre, Gregory H.; Paus, Kim H.; Natarajan, Poornima; Gulliver, John S.; Novak, Paige J.; Hozalski, Raymond M. (2015). "Review of Dissolved Pollutants in Urban Storm Water and Their Removal and Fate in Bioretention Cells". Journal of Environmental Engineering. 141 (1): 04014050. doi:10.1061/(ASCE)EE.1943-7870.0000876.
- Xiao, Feng; Simcik, Matt F.; Halbach, Thomas R.; Gulliver, John S. (2015). "Perfluorooctane sulfonate (PFOS) and perfluorooctanoate (PFOA) in soils and groundwater of a U.S. metropolitan area: Migration and implications for human exposure". Water Research. 72: 64–74. Bibcode:2015WatRe..72...64X. doi:10.1016/j.watres.2014.09.052. PMID 25455741.
