= Tomcat =

Tomcat may refer to:

== Animals ==
- A sexually mature male cat
- Paederus, known as Tomcat in Indonesia

== Media ==
- Tom Cat, a character from the animated series Tom and Jerry
- Tom Cat (album), a 1981 album by Lee Morgan
- Tom Cat (band), a Japanese band who contributed to the Fist of the North Star soundtrack
- Tomcat (comics), DC Comics character, son of Wildcat
- Tomcat (video game), a 1989 computer game published in the UK by Players Software
- Tomcats (1977 film), a 1977 rape-and-revenge film
- Tomcats (2001 film), a 2001 comedy film
- The Tomcats, Brian Setzer's first rockabilly music group
- TomKat, a portmanteau for celebrity couple Tom Cruise and Katie Holmes
- Tomcat (2016 film), a 2016 Austrian film
- Talking Tom, a character in Outfit7's Talking Tom and Friends media franchise

== Science and technology ==
- Apache Tomcat, an implementation of Java web-server technologies
- Beretta 3032 Tomcat, a pistol
- Grumman F-14 Tomcat, a fighter aircraft
- Kawasaki Tomcat ZX-10, a motorcycle
- Rover 200 Coupé, a car
- TOMCAT/SLIMCAT, a chemical transport model
- Waspair HM 81 Tomcat, an ultralight aircraft
