= CLaMS =

Modular chemistry transport model system

CLaMS (Chemical Lagrangian Model of the Stratosphere) is a modular chemistry transport model (CTM) system developed at Forschungszentrum Jülich, Germany. CLaMS was first described by McKenna et al. (2002a,b) and was expanded into three dimensions by Konopka et al. (2004). CLaMS has been employed in recent European field campaigns THESEO, EUPLEX, TROCCINOX SCOUT-O3, and RECONCILE with a focus on simulating ozone depletion and water vapour transport.

Major strengths of CLaMS in comparison to other CTMs are

1. its applicability for reverse domain filling studies
2. its anisotropic mixing scheme
3. its integrability with arbitrary observational data
4. its comprehensive chemistry scheme

== CLaMS gridding ==
Unlike other CTMs (e.g. SLIMCAT, REPROBUS), CLaMS operates on a Lagrangian model grid (see section about model grids in general circulation model): an air parcel is described by three space coordinates and a time coordinate. The time evolution path that an air parcels traces in space is called a trajectory. A specialised mixing scheme ensures that physically realistic diffusion is imposed on an ensemble of trajectories in regions of high wind shear.

CLaMS operates on arbitrarily resolved horizontal grids. The space coordinates are latitude, longitude and potential temperature.

== CLaMS hierarchy ==
CLaMS is composed of four modules and several preprocessors. The four modules are

1. a trajectory module
2. a box chemistry module
3. a Lagrangian mixing module
4. a Lagrangian sedimentation scheme

=== Trajectory module ===
Integration of trajectories with 4th order Runge–Kutta method, integration time step 30 minutes. Vertical displacement of trajectories is calculated from radiation budget.

=== Box chemistry module ===
Chemistry is based on the ASAD chemistry code of the University of Cambridge. More than 100 chemical reactions involving 40+ chemical species are considered. Integration time step is 10 minutes, species can be combined into chemical families to facilitate integration. The module includes a radiative transfer model for the determination of photolysis rates. The module also includes heterogeneous reactions on NAT, ice and liquid particle surfaces.

=== Lagrangian mixing ===
Mixing is based on grid deformation of quasi uniform air parcel distributions. The contraction or elongation factors of the distances to neighboring air parcels are examined: if a critical elongation (contraction) is reached, new air parcels are introduced (taken away). This way, anisotropic diffusion is simulated in a physically realistic manner.

=== Lagrangian sedimentation ===
Lagrangian sedimentation is calculated by following individual nitric acid trihydrate (NAT) particles that may grow or shrink by the uptake or release of HNO_{3} from/to the gas phase. These particle parcels are simulated independently from the Lagrangian air parcels. Their trajectories are determined using the horizontal winds and their vertical settling velocity that depends on the size of the individual particles. NAT particles are nucleated assuming a constant nucleation rate and they evaporate where temperatures grow too high. With this, a vertical redistribution of HNO_{3} (denitrification and nitrification) is determined.

== CLaMS data sets ==
A chemical transport model does not simulate the dynamics of the atmosphere. For CLaMS, the following meteorological data sets have been used

- European Centre for Medium-Range Weather Forecasts (ECMWF), Predictions, Analyses, ERA-15, ERA-40
- United Kingdom Met Office (UKMO)
- European Centre Hamburg Atmospheric Model (ECHAM4), in the DLR version

To initialize the chemical fields in CLaMS, data from a large variety of instruments have provided data.

- on satellite (CRISTA, MIPAS, MLS, HALOE, ILAS, ...),
- on aircraft and balloons (HALOX, FISH, Mark IV, BONBON...)

If no observations are present, the chemical fields can be initialised from two-dimensional chemical models, chemistry-climate models, climatologies, or from correlations between chemical species or chemical species and dynamical variables.

== See also ==
- Forschungszentrum Jülich
- Ozone depletion
- Meteorology
