= CHIMERE chemistry-transport model =

Chemistry-transport model

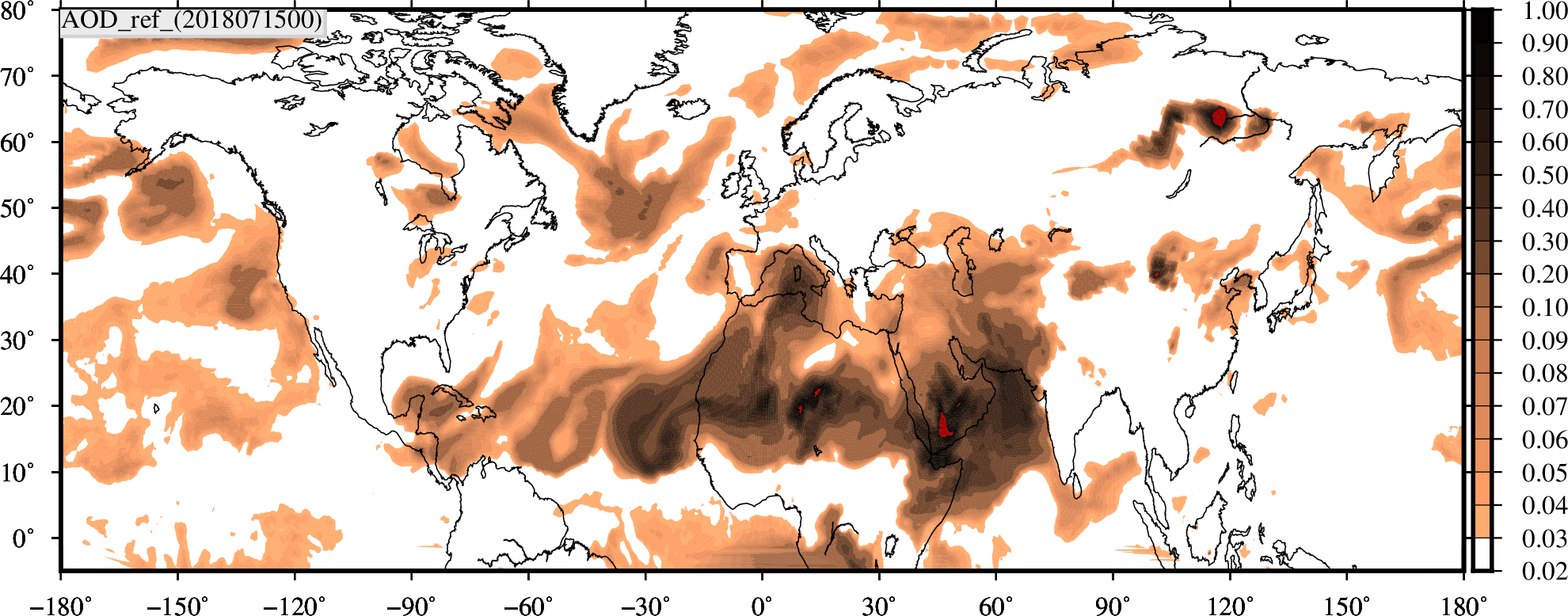
Map of Aerosol Optical Depth simulated by the CHIMERE model

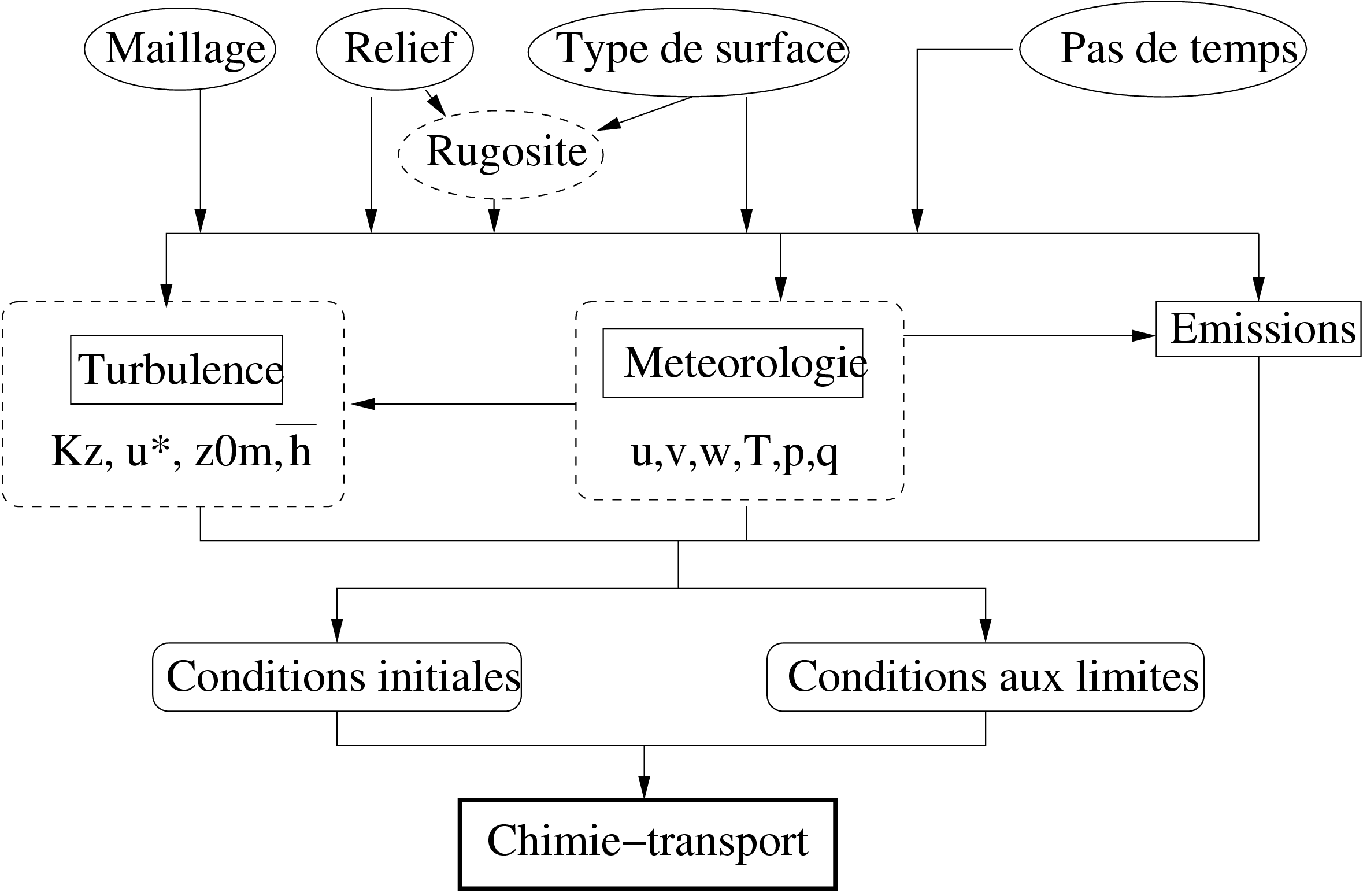
General organization of a chemistry-transport model

CHIMERE is a chemistry-transport model. It is a computer program that unites a set of equations representing the transport and the chemistry of atmospheric species making it possible to quantify the evolution of air masses and pollution plumes as a function of time on different scales (from urban to continental). Using meteorological inputs and emission fluxes, CHIMERE calculates three-dimensional concentrations of pollutants in the atmosphere. Due to the input data used, the number of equations that are solved and the physico-chemistry included in the model, CHIMERE is considered to be a mesoscale model, i.e. simulating the troposphere (from the surface to 20 hPa) for a horizontal resolution of 1 to 100 km and over study areas ranging from the city to the hemisphere.

== Simulated pollutants ==
Atmospheric pollutants are gaseous molecules or particles present in the Earth's atmosphere and are considered to be in excess in some cases; generally considered as air pollution. Beyond a certain concentration threshold, their content can be toxic to the vegetation or to human health. These thresholds are different for each pollutant and are monitored hourly on surface-level atmosphere. CHIMERE simulates around a hundred gaseous and aerosol chemical species, including those monitored on a daily basis: ozone O_{3}, nitrogen oxides NO and NO_{2}, particulate matter PM, carbon monoxide CO and sulfur dioxide SO_{2}.

== Possible applications ==
This numerical model can have several applications:

1. analyze past pollution episodes, by comparing available measurements to model results: this allows not only to better understand the mechanics of a particular episode but also to highlight the weaknesses of the model and therefore to guide the path for future development.
2. make scenarios: in particular by simulating a period for the first time in realistic conditions, then by redoing the simulation by modifying the emissions for example. For this example, this type of exercise makes it possible to quantify the gain that a decline in emissions could have or, on the contrary, to estimate the damage in advance in a possible future where emissions keep increasing.
3. carry out air quality forecasts: this is done typically two to three days in advance and over a given region. The CHIMERE model is used by a large number of air quality monitoring agencies in Europe for this purpose. In France, it is notably the model implemented daily for pollution forecasts (as part of the “Air Quality and the Rational Use of Energy” law passed on the 30 September 1996) by AIRPARIF in the Paris region and Atmo Grand Est in the Grand Est region. In France on a national level, CHIMERE is the modeling tool implemented by INERIS for the PREVAIR air quality forecasting platform.

== Basis of the model ==
The CHIMERE model necessitates three main phases: a data preparation phase (pre-processing) essential for a simulation, the model itself for calculating atmospheric concentrations and a results exploitation phase (post-processing). This principle is true for all digital tools of this type (see figure).

- Phase 1 - pre-processing:

The preprocessing phase contains the preparation of the input information necessary for running a chemistry-transport model throughout its simulation (several days or weeks are calculated with a time step of a few seconds): meteorological fields and emissions (of different sources). Additional inputs are also prepared during this step, which represent the initial and boundary conditions (chemical concentrations) and land surface information (soil and surface types, vegetation).

- Phase 2 - CHIMERE model

After reading all the input data, systems of stiff differential equations, including all chemical reactions included in the model (with species having from a few microseconds to several days of lifetime in the atmosphere) are integrated over time and space. At the same time, transport (advection and convection), turbulence, emissions (sources) and dry and wet deposition (sinks) are treated in the form of flows which will increase (in case of sources) or decrease (in case of sinks) the pollutant concentrations for each chemical species, cell by cell and minute by minute.

- Phase 3 - Post-processing:

Post-processing allows to analyze the results of the simulation. Concentration fields at thousands of cell points and hour by hour often represent too much information to draw conclusions from directly. This step makes it possible to calculate scores (by comparing the results of the simulation to surface stations, by which we seek to quantify the precision of the simulations in relation to observations), synthetic maps (for example maximum ozone or particles over a day, average daily SO_{2} concentration, etc.).

== Current research with the model ==
The CHIMERE model is under continuous development and a new version of the code is made available to users about once a year. If the regional modeling of gaseous species is relatively well represented at this point, there are still great uncertainties in the simulation of aerosols. Aerosols have different origins (anthropogenic and urban, fire combustion aerosols, or mineral aerosols) and different lifetimes, making modeling them correctly complex. Current research is revolving around impact of air quality on health, including design of models that can compute the exposure of the population to different pollutants but also to around the consideration of new species to monitor (such as pollen, which are highly allergenic). The latest version of the model includes so-called "on-line" effects. Until recently, this type of model was always in "off-line" mode; i.e. the meteorology was pre-calculated and then used to calculate the chemistry and transport of pollutants. In the latest v2020 version, feedback between meteorology and atmospheric chemistry have been implemented, making it possible to calculate the radiative impact of aerosols (direct effects) and cloud formation (indirect effects) more realistically.

== Development and distribution of the model ==
The model is developed by researchers from the P.S.Laplace CNRS Institute (IPSL). The code is developed under the GNU GPL free software license and is available on a website, http://www.lmd.polytechnique.fr/chimere.
