= Ozone depletion and climate change =

Ozone depletion and climate change are environmental challenges whose connections have been explored and which have been compared and contrasted, for example in terms of global regulation, in various studies and books.

There is widespread scientific interest in better regulation of climate change, ozone depletion and air pollution, as in general the human relationship with the biosphere is deemed of major historiographical and political significance. Already by 1994 the legal debates about respective regulation regimes on climate change, ozone depletion and air pollution were being dubbed "monumental" and a combined synopsis provided.

There are some parallels between atmospheric chemistry and anthropogenic emissions in the discussions which have taken place and the regulatory attempts which have been made. Most important is that the gases causing both problems have long lifetimes after emission to the atmosphere, thus causing problems that are difficult to reverse. However, the Vienna Convention for the Protection of the Ozone Layer and the Montreal Protocol that amended it are seen as success stories, while the Kyoto Protocol on anthropogenic climate change has largely failed. Currently, efforts are being undertaken to assess the reasons and to use synergies, for example with regard to data reporting and policy design and further exchanging of information.

Ozone depletion is not a primary cause of climate change; however, there exists a physical science connection between the two phenomena. The Earth's atmospheric ozone has two major effects on the Earth's temperature balance. Firstly, it absorbs solar ultraviolet radiation, leading to the heating of the stratosphere. Secondly, it also traps heat in the troposphere by absorbing infrared radiation emitted by the Earth's surface. Ozone depletion in the stratosphere has had a negative radiative forcing impact; however, anthropogenic increases in tropospheric abundance more than offset this.

Additionally, chlorofluorocarbons (CFCs) and other halocarbons which have caused ozone depletion are strong greenhouse gases, and the warming influence of the addition of these to the atmosphere has been greater than the net effect of the anthropogenic changes in the amount of ozone. Projections show that CFCs and other halocarbons will have contributed to between 4-10% of total expected greenhouse warming by the year 2100.

== Policy approach ==
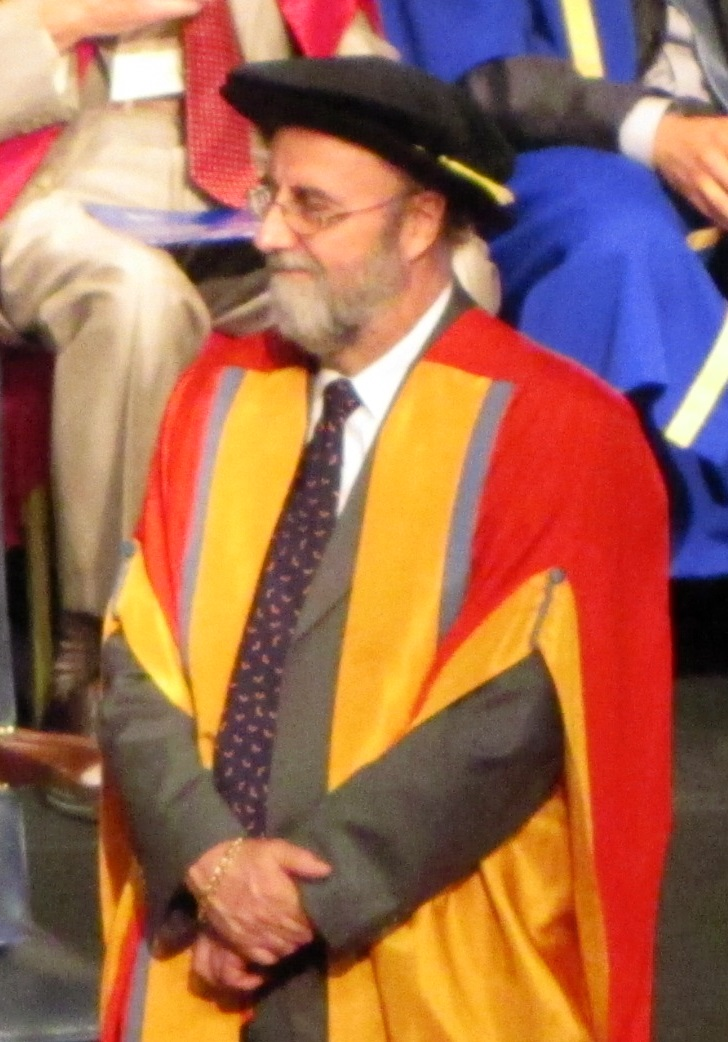
Sir Robert (Bob) Watson played an important role in both cases

There are both links and major differences between ozone depletion and global warming and the way the two challenges have been handled. While in the case of atmospheric ozone depletion, in a situation of high uncertainty and against strong resistance, climate change regulation attempts at the international level such as the Kyoto Protocol have failed to reduce global emissions. The Vienna Convention for the Protection of the Ozone Layer and the Montreal Protocol were both originally signed by only some member states of the United Nations (43 nations in the case of the Montreal Protocol in 1986) while Kyoto attempted to create a worldwide agreement from scratch. Expert consensus concerning CFCs in the form of the Scientific Assessment of Ozone Depletion was reached long after the first regulatory steps were taken, and as of 29 December 2012, all countries in the United Nations plus the Cook Islands, the Holy See, Niue and the supranational European Union had ratified the original Montreal Protocol. These countries have also ratified the London, Copenhagen, and Montreal amendments to the Protocol. As of 15 April 2014, the Beijing amendments had not been ratified by two state parties.

After the Vienna Convention, the halocarbon industry shifted its position and started supporting a protocol to limit CFC production. US manufacturer DuPont acted more quickly than their European counterparts. The EU shifted its position as well after Germany, which has a substantial chemical industry, gave up its defence of the CFC industry and started supporting more regulation. Government and industry in France and the UK had tried to defend their CFC-producing industries even after the Montreal Protocol had been signed.

The Vienna Convention was installed before a scientific consensus on the ozone hole was established. On the contrary, until the 1980s the EU, NASA, NAS, UNEP, WMO and the British government had issued scientific reports with divergent conclusions. Sir Robert (Bob) Watson, Director of the Science Division at NASA, played a crucial role in the process of reaching a unified assessment.

== Policy and consensus ==
Layers of the atmosphere (not to scale). The Earth's ozone layer is mainly found in the lower portion of the stratosphere from approximately 20 to 30 kilometres (12 to 19 mi) above Earth.

Aant Elzinga wrote in 1996 about the consensus, that the Intergovernmental Panel on Climate Change has tried in the prior two reports a global consensus approach to climate action. Stephen Schneider and Paul N. Edwards, noted in 1997, that after the IPCC Second Assessment Report, the lobby group Global Climate Coalition and a few self-proclaimed “contrarian” scientists tried to discredit the conclusions of the report. They pointed out that the goal of the IPCC is to fairly represent the complete range of credible scientific opinion and if possible a consensus view.

In 2007, Reiner Grundmann compared climate actions in Europe and the United States, he interpreted the inaction besides existing consensus, and noted, Political agenda that drove US climate change policy. The high visibility of skeptical scientists in the media resonates with this, and wrote that Germany started ambitious goals, reduced emissions, because ‘balanced reporting’ led to a bias in climate change coverage in advantage of skeptical arguments in the U.S., but not so much in Germany. Additionally, Grundmann pointed out that after warnings from scientists in 1986 the German Parliament commissioned the Enquetekommission ‘Vorsorge zum Schutz der Erdatmosphäre’ (Precaution for the Protection of the Earth's Atmosphere), to assess the situation, consisting of scientists, politicians and representatives of interest groups. Three years later the report made an impact with the assessment of the state of the art in climate research, an assessment of the threat of climate change itself as well as suggestions for clear emissions reduction targets, even though he argues there was no consensus, and attributed the success of the report to strong precautionary action, and that no scientific outsiders or climate change deniers were involved.

A linear model of policy-making, based on a position that "the more knowledge we have, the better the political response will be", was not applied in the ozone case. On the contrary, the CFC regulation process focused more on managing ignorance and uncertainties as a basis of political decision making, as the relationships between science, public (lack of) understanding and policy were better taken into account. In the meantime, such a player in the IPCC process as Michael Oppenheimer conceded some limitations of the IPCC consensus approach and asked for concurring, smaller assessments of special problems instead of repetitions of the large-scale approach every six years. It has become more important to provide a broader exploration of uncertainties. Others also see mixed blessings in the drive for consensus within the IPCC process and have asked for dissenting or minority positions to be included or for statements about uncertainties to be improved.

== Public opinion ==
The two atmospheric problems have achieved significantly different levels of understanding by the public, including both the basic science and policy issues. People have limited scientific knowledge about global warming and tend to confuse it with or see it as a subset of the ozone hole. Not only on the policy level, ozone regulation fared much better than climate change in public opinion. Americans voluntarily switched away from aerosol sprays before the legislation was enforced, while climate change has failed in achieving a broader scientific comprehension and in raising comparable concern.

The metaphors used in the CFC discussion (ozone shield, ozone hole) resonated better with non-scientists and their concerns. The ozone case was communicated to lay persons "with easy-to-understand bridging metaphors derived from the popular culture" and related to "immediate risks with everyday relevance", while the public opinion on climate change sees no imminent danger. The ozone hole was much more seen as a "hot issue" and imminent risk compared to global climate change, as lay people feared a depletion of the ozone layer (ozone shield) risked increasing severe consequences such as skin cancer, cataracts, damage to plants, and reduction of plankton populations in the ocean's photic zone. This was not the case with global warming.

== Personal risk assessment and knowledge ==
Sheldon Ungar, a Canadian sociologist, assumes that while the quantity of specialized knowledge is exploding, in contrast scientific ignorance among lay people is the norm and even increasing. Public opinion failed to tie climate change to concrete events which could be used as a threshold or beacon to signify immediate danger. Scientific predictions of a temperature rise of 2 °C (4 °F) to 3 °C (5 °F) over several decades do not resonate with people, for example in North America, who experience similar swings during a single day. As scientists define global warming as a problem of the future, a liability in the "attention economy", pessimistic outlooks in general and the attribution of extreme weather to climate change have often been discredited or ridiculed in the public arena (compare the Gore effect). Even when James Hansen tried to use the 1988–89 North American drought as a call to action, scientists kept stating, in line with the IPCC findings, that even extreme weather is not climate. While the greenhouse effect, per se, is essential for life on earth, the case was quite different with the ozone hole and other metaphors about ozone depletion. The scientific assessment of the ozone problem also had large uncertainties; both the ozone content of the upper atmosphere and its depletion are complicated to measure and the link between ozone depletion and rates of enhanced skin cancer is rather weak. But the metaphors used in the discussion (ozone shield, ozone hole) resonated better with lay people and their concerns.

The idea of rays penetrating a damaged “shield” meshes nicely with abiding and resonant cultural motifs, including “Hollywood affinities.” These range from the shields on the Starship Enterprise to Star Wars ... It is these pre-scientific bridging metaphors built around the penetration of a deteriorating shield that render the ozone problem relatively simple. That the ozone threat can be linked with Darth Vader means that it is encompassed in common sense understandings that are deeply ingrained and widely shared.

— Sheldon Ungar

The CFC regulation attempts at the end of the 1980s profited from those easy to grasp metaphors and the personal risk assumptions taken from them. The fate of celebrities like President Ronald Reagan, who had skin cancer removal from his nose in 1985 and 1987, was also of high importance. In case of the public opinion on climate change, no imminent danger is perceived.

== Cost-benefit assessments and industry policy ==
Cass Sunstein and others have compared the differing approach of the United States to the Montreal Protocol, which it accepted, and the Kyoto Protocol, which it rejected. Sunstein assumes that the cost-benefit assessments of climate change action for the US were instrumental in the US' withdrawal from participation in Kyoto. Daniel Magraw, also a lawyer, considers governmental motivations besides relative costs and benefits as being of higher importance. Peter Orszag and Terry Dinan took an insurance perspective and assume that an assessment which predicted dire consequences of climate change would be more of a motivation for the US to change its stance on global warming and adopting regulation measurements.

The US chemical company DuPont had already lost some of their zeal in defending their products after a strategic manufacturing patent for Freon was set to expire in 1979. A citizen boycott of spray cans gained importance in parallel. Not by chance, the United States banned the use of CFCs in aerosol cans in 1978.

Government and industry in France and the UK tried to defend their CFC-producing industries even after the Montreal Protocol had been signed. The European Community rejected proposals to ban CFCs in aerosol sprays for a long time. The EU shifted its position after Germany, which also has a large chemical industry, gave up its defence of the CFC industry and started supporting moves towards regulation. After regulation was more and more enforced, DuPont acted faster than their European counterparts as they may have feared court action related to increased skin cancer, especially as the EPA had published a study in 1986 claiming that an additional 40 million cases and 800,000 cancer deaths were to be expected in the US in the next 88 years. The identification and marketing of a 100% ozone-safe hydrocarbon refrigerant called "Greenfreeze" by the NGO Greenpeace in the early 1990s had a rapid significant impact in major markets of Europe and Asia. The climate change protocols were less successful. In the case of Kyoto, then secretary of the environment Angela Merkel, prevented a possible failure by suggesting to use 1990 as starting date for emission reduction. In so far the demise of the Eastern European heavy industry allowed for a high commitment, but actual emissions kept on growing on a global scale.

== Science background ==
There are various links between the two fields of human-atmospheric interaction. Policy experts have advocated for a closer linking of ozone protection and climate protection efforts.

Ozone is a greenhouse gas, and changes in its atmospheric abundance due to human activity have radiative forcing effects. Ozone absorbs both ultraviolet (UV) radiation from the sun and infrared radiation emitted from Earth's surface. Human activity has depleted ozone in the stratopshere and increased its abundance in the troposphere, producing opposing radiative forcing effects. Estimates of the magnitudes of these effects have considerable uncertainty. The majority of models evaluate the overal radiative forcing impact of anthropogenic changes in ozone to be a moderate warming effect. Such estimation is difficult for multiple reasons, including that, unlike most other greenhouse gases, ozone is not a well-mixed gas in the atmosphere, so modelling must take into account its spatial distribution. Additionally knowledge of the pre-industrial levels of ozone in the atmosphere is incomplete.

Many ozone-depleting substances are also greenhouse gases, some are thousands of times more powerful than carbon dioxide on a per-molecule basis over the short and medium term. The increases in concentrations of these chemicals have produced 0.34 ± 0.03 W/m^{2} of radiative forcing, corresponding to about 14% of the total radiative forcing from increases in the concentrations of well-mixed greenhouse gases. Because of their ozone depleting effects, production of CFCs and many other related substances have been banned globally by the 1987 Montreal Protocol and its subsequent revisions. By one model-based estimate, had these continued to be produced unabated global temperatures in 2100 would be 2.5 °C greater than they would otherwise have been; 1.7 °C from the direct greenhouse effect of the additional CFCs, and 0.8 °C from increased CO_{2} due to UV vegetation damage.

Radiative forcing from various greenhouse gases and other sources.

Drew Shindell has used climate models to assess both climate change and ozone depletion. In his view, while research up to now has been more about the impact of CFC emissions on stratospheric ozone, the future will be more about the interaction between climate change and ozone feedback. Already the natural ozone variability in the stratosphere seems to be closely correlated with the 11-year solar cycle of irradiance changes and has, via a dynamic coupling between the stratosphere and troposphere, a significant impact on climate. Ozone acts like a shield in the stratosphere, and protects life from extremely harmful ultraviolet radiation that comes from the sun. In the absence of stratospheric ozone, life forms would simply not exist.

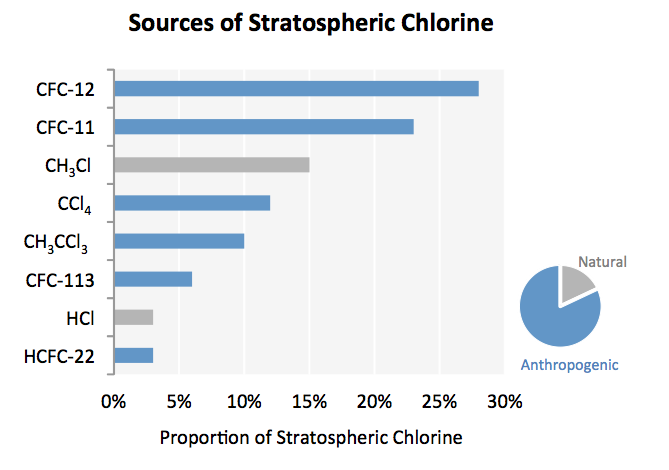
Sources of Stratospheric Chlorine

As with carbon dioxide and methane, there are some natural sources of tropospheric chlorine, such as sea spray. Chlorine from ocean spray is soluble and thus is washed by rainfall before it reaches the stratosphere. It is stratospheric chlorine that affects ozone depletion. Only methyl chloride, which is one of the halocarbons, has a mainly natural source, and it is responsible for about 20% of the chlorine in the stratosphere; the remaining 80% comes from man-made sources. Chlorofluorocarbons, in contrast, are insoluble and long-lived, allowing them to reach the stratosphere. In the lower atmosphere, there is much more chlorine from CFCs and related haloalkanes than there is in hydrogen chloride from salt spray, and in the stratosphere halocarbons are dominant.

The same CO_{2} radiative forcing that produces global warming is expected to cool the stratosphere. This cooling, in turn, is expected to produce a relative increase in ozone (O_{3}) depletion in the polar area and in the frequency of ozone holes. Conversely, ozone depletion represents a radiative forcing of the climate system of about −0.15 ± 0.10 watts per square metre (W/m^{2}).

== See also ==
- Climate change in the Arctic
