= Air pollution forecasting =

Air pollution forecasting is the application of science and technology to predict the composition of the air pollution in the atmosphere for a given location and time. An algorithm prediction of the pollutant concentrations can be translated into air quality index, same as actual measurements.

Countries and cities are given forecasts by state and local government organizations, as well as private companies like Airly, AirVisual, Aerostate, Ambee, BreezoMeter, PlumeLabs, and DRAXIS that provide air pollution forecasts.

== Motivation ==
Air pollution is one of the world’s biggest problems, and it causes respiratory problems, lung diseases, and cardiovascular issues and can contribute to mental health issues and aggravate existing health conditions. It can cause depletion to planetary health equally. Therefore, reducing and making people aware of these problems caused by air pollution becomes essential.

With the accurate method of forecasting air pollution, it becomes easier to manage and mitigate the risks of air pollution and ensure a safe level of pollutant concentration in the region. It also helps assess risks to the environment and the climate caused by poor air quality standards. Accurate forecasting can also lead to ease in planning day-to-day activities, avoiding locations with high alert areas, and implementing effective pollution control measures.

== Techniques ==
As with weather forecasting, air pollution forecasting involves the central idea of taking a current snapshot of the atmosphere and using computer simulation to predict what happens next. A typical algorithm uses the following components:

- An input of current air quality, monitored by local stations and remote sensing.
- An input of the forecasted weather during the period of prediction, to predict any pollutant's movement.
- A model of pollutant emission. This can include traffic, industry, and pollen. The cycles of pollutant emission range from daily to weekly (for human commute) and yearly (for pollen and coal-burning). Non-periodic sources such as wildfire are also considered when known.
  - Pollen forecasting not only matters for forecast of PM concentration, but also for allergies. There are a range of ways to do so, some taking into account the predicted weather.
  - Recent studies have incorporated machine learning techniques such as neural networks, regressions, and random forests to achieve high accuracy in this part.
- An input of the local terrain.
- An understanding of how pollutants act given certain weather and terrain conditions. This is the job done by chemical transport models and atmospheric dispersion modeling. The concentration of pollutants in the atmosphere is determined by their transport, or mean velocity of movement through the atmosphere, their diffusion, chemical transformation, and ground deposition.

The forecast temporally resolution is usually daily or hourly and the spatial resolution can change from block resolution to dozens of km resolution.

Most forecasts of air quality cover two to five days.

Advanced approaches in air quality forecasting combine historical data with data generated via on-ground sensors and satellite observations to provide insights, analysis, and forecasts from global to street-level air pollution. It also takes into consideration local factors like traffic, regional weather patterns, or emissions in the atmosphere.

== Challenges ==
Meteorological conditions such as thermal inversions can prevent surface air from rising, trapping pollutants near the surface, which makes accurate forecasts of such events crucial for air quality modeling.

Urban air quality models require a very fine computational mesh, requiring the use of high-resolution mesoscale weather models; in spite of this, the quality of numerical weather guidance is the main uncertainty in air quality forecasts.

== Uses ==
By knowing the air quality forecast one can decide how to act, e.g. due to air pollution health effects, one can prepare ahead of time and choose the best time to do an outdoor activity.

- Deciding whether to put on a skin care ointment.
- Find the cleanest route for driving, walking or cycling.
- Deciding whether to leave the windows open or closed.
- Governments can utilize air quality forecasts to implement effective pollution control measures.

== See also ==
- Numerical weather prediction
