= Equivalent effective stratospheric chlorine =

Equivalent effective stratospheric chlorine (EESC) provides an estimate of the total effective amount of halogens (chlorine and bromine) in the stratosphere. It is calculated from emission of chlorofluorocarbon and related halogenated compounds into the troposphere (lower atmosphere) and their efficiency in contributing to stratospheric ozone depletion (ozone depletion potential, ODP), and by making assumptions on transport times into the upper atmosphere (stratosphere). This parameter is used to quantify man-made ozone depletion and its changes with time. As a consequence of the Montreal Protocol and its amendments phasing out ozone-depleting substances (ODS), the EESC reached maximum in the late 1990s and is now slowly decreasing.
