= Robert Watson (chemist) =

British chemist and atmospheric scientist (born 1948)

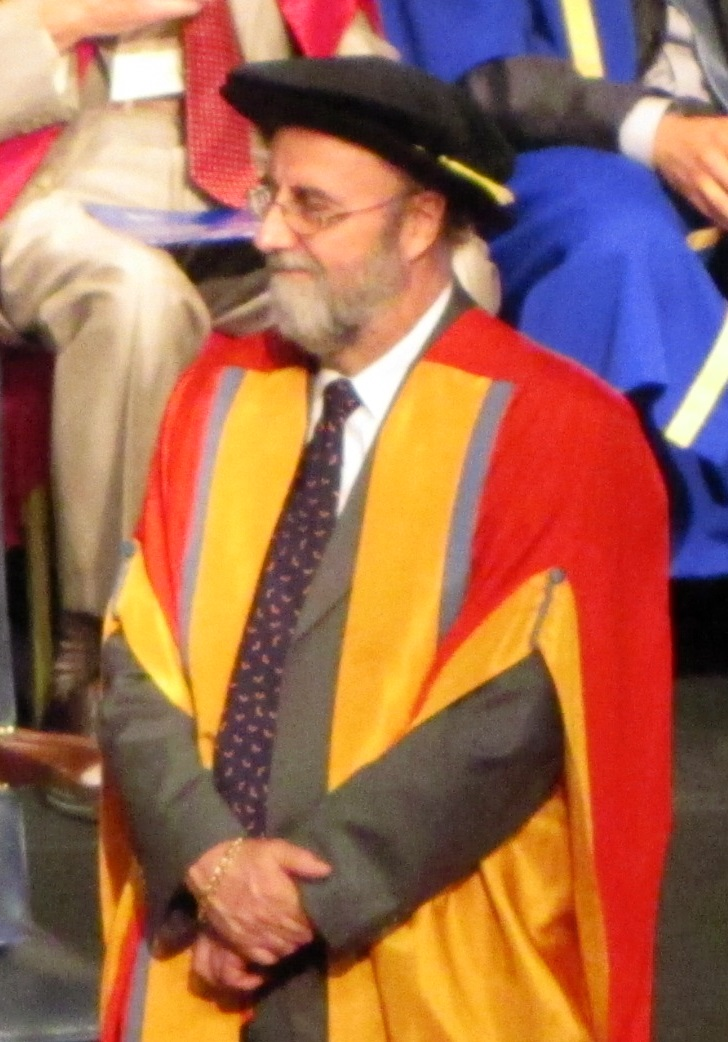
- Born: 21 March 1948 (age 78)
- Education: Queen Mary University of London
- Awards: Blue Planet Prize (2010); FRS (2011)
- Scientific career
- Fields: Atmospheric scientist
- Workplaces: University of East Anglia
- Thesis: The study of some reactions involving halogen atoms and oxyhalide free radicals by molecular beam mass spectrometry (1973)

Sir Robert Tony Watson CMG FRS (born 21 March 1948) is a British chemist who has worked on atmospheric science issues including ozone depletion, global warming and paleoclimatology since the 1980s. Most recently, Watson served as an assessment co-chair for the United Nations Global Environment Outlook 2025 report.

== Education and awards ==
Watson received a PhD in gas phase chemical kinetics (atmospheric chemistry) from Queen Mary College, University of London in 1973. He has received awards for his contributions to science, including the NAS Award for Scientific Reviewing from the National Academy of Sciences in 1992, the American Association for the Advancement of Science Award for Scientific Freedom and Responsibility in 1993, the insignia of Honorary Companion of St Michael and St George from the British Government in 2003, and the Champions of the Earth Award from the United Nations Environment Programme in 2014. In 2020 he was elected to the American Philosophical Society.

== Career ==
Watson was the Director of the Science Division and Chief Scientist for the Office of Mission to Planet Earth at the National Aeronautics and Space Administration (NASA). Watson then became Associate Director for Environment in the Office of the President of the United States in the White House.

In 1996, Watson joined the World Bank as the Senior Scientific adviser in the Environment Department, became Director of the Environment Department and Head of the Environment Sector Board in 1997 and is currently the Chief Scientist and Senior Adviser for Sustainable Development. He took up a position as Chair of Environmental Science and Science Director of the Tyndall Centre at the University of East Anglia, United Kingdom, in August 2007 and joined the British Government's Department for Environment, Food and Rural Affairs (Defra) as Chief Scientific Adviser in September 2007.

Watson had a role in the regulation efforts related to both ozone depletion and global warming. The Montreal and Vienna conventions were installed long before a scientific consensus was established. Until the 1980s EU, NASA, NAS, UNEP, WMO and the British government had dissenting scientific reports. Watson played a role in the process of unified assessments and did so as well for the IPCC.

He was Chairman of the Global Environment Facility's Scientific and Technical Advisory Panel from 1991 to 1994, Chair of the Intergovernmental Panel on Climate Change (IPCC) from 1997 to 2002 and Board co-chair for the Millennium Ecosystem Assessment from 2000 to 2005. He was then Director of the International Assessment of Agricultural Science and Technology for Development which ran from 2005 to 2007, and had previously been co-chair of the International Scientific Assessment of Stratospheric Ozone for their reports from 1994 to 2006. He has been Chair or co-chair of other international scientific assessments, including the IPCC Working Group II, the United Nations Environment Programme/World Meteorological Organization (UNEP/WMO), and the UNEP Global Biodiversity Assessment.

Watson was knighted in the 2012 New Year Honours for his government service.

He is currently Director of Strategic Development for the Tyndall Centre for Climate Change Research at the University of East Anglia.

On 29 February 2016, Watson was elected Chair of IPBES at the Fourth Plenary of that organisation after having served as its vice-president before.

== Opinions ==
Andrew Revkin writing for the New York Times described Watson as an "outspoken advocate of the idea that human actions—mainly burning coal and oil—are contributing to global warming and must be changed to avert environmental upheavals."

In April 2002 the United States pressed for and won his replacement by Rajendra Pachauri as IPCC chair. According to New Scientist, "The oil industry seems to be behind the move." The industry campaign to oust Watson had begun days after George W. Bush's inauguration in January 2001, with a memo to the White House from Randy Randol of oil giant ExxonMobil asking "Can Watson be replaced now at the request of the US?"

In 2000, Watson stated:

The overwhelming majority of scientific experts, whilst recognising that scientific uncertainties exist, nonetheless believe that human-induced climate change is inevitable. Indeed, during the last few years, many parts of the world have suffered major heat waves, floods, droughts, fires and extreme weather events leading to significant economic losses and loss of life. While individual events cannot be directly linked to human-induced climate change, the frequency and magnitude of these types of events are predicted to increase in a warmer world.

The question is not whether climate will change in response to human activities, but rather how much (magnitude), how fast (the rate of change) and where (regional patterns). It is also clear that climate change will, in many parts of the world, adversely affect socio-economic sectors, including water resources, agriculture, forestry, fisheries and human settlements, ecological systems (particularly forests and coral reefs), and human health (particularly diseases spread by insects), with developing countries being the most vulnerable. The good news is, however, that the majority of experts believe that significant reductions in net greenhouse gas emissions are technically feasible due to an extensive array of technologies and policy measures in the energy supply, energy demand and agricultural and forestry sectors. In addition, the projected adverse effects of climate change on socio-economic and ecological systems can, to some degree, be reduced through proactive adaptation measures. These are the fundamental conclusions, taken from already approved/accepted IPCC assessments, of a careful and objective analysis of all relevant scientific, technical and economic information by thousands of experts from the appropriate fields of science from academia, governments, industry and environmental organisations from around the world.

== See also ==
- Global warming
- Kyoto Protocol

Political offices
Preceded by Bert Bolin	Chairman of the IPCC; 1997–2002	Succeeded by Rajendra K. Pachauri
