= International Assessment of Agricultural Knowledge, Science and Technology for Development =

Food politics

The International Assessment of Agricultural Knowledge, Science and Technology for Development (IAASTD) was a three-year international collaborative effort (2005–2007) initiated by the World Bank in 2002, which evaluated the relevance, quality and effectiveness of agricultural knowledge, science, and technology, and the effectiveness of public and private sector policies and institutional arrangements.

The project involved 900 participants and 110 countries with co-sponsorship of the FAO, Global Environment Facility, UNDP, UNEP, UNESCO, the World Bank and WHO. It assessed agricultural knowledge, science, and technology with respect to development and sustainability goals of reducing hunger and poverty, improving nutrition, health, rural livelihoods, and facilitating social and environmental sustainability.

The results of the project were reviewed and ratified during the intergovernmental plenary meeting held 7–12 April 2008, in Johannesburg, South Africa.

== Governance ==
The geographically based multi-stakeholder Bureau was composed of 30 government representatives from different regions, 22 representatives from non-governmental organizations, consumer groups and producer groups, representatives from 8 institutions, and 2 co-chairs. The sponsoring agencies served as ex officio members of the Bureau.

The IAASTD had a distributed secretariat for management and oversight in Washington DC and others in FAO (Rome), UNEP (Nairobi), and UNESCO (Paris). The Director was Robert T. Watson.

== Structure ==
The IAASTD was composed of one Global Assessment and five Sub-global Assessments, which used the same framework: the impacts of agricultural knowledge, science, and technology on hunger, poverty, nutrition, human health, and environmental and social sustainability in the past and the future. The Global and Sub-global assessments were peer-reviewed by governments and experts, and approved by the panel of participating governments.

The five Sub-global Assessments complemented the Global Assessment by examining geographic area-specific aspects:

- Central and West Asia and North Africa (CWANA) – Regional Institute: ICARDA (International Center for Agricultural Research in the Dry Areas)
- East and South Asia and the Pacific (ESAP) – Regional Institute: World Fish Center
- Latin America and the Caribbean (LAC) – Regional Institute: IICA (Inter-American Institute for Cooperation on Agriculture)
- North America and Europe (NAE)
- Sub-Saharan Africa – Regional Institute: ACTS (African Centre for Technology Studies)

The assessments were accompanied by a synthesis report which covered challenges faced by agriculture today: pros and cons of bioenergy, potential role of biotechnology, effects of climate change, effects on health, use of natural resources, small farmers and global trade, future role for traditional farming, women in agriculture, and options for action.

== Final report ==
On 15 April 2008, IAASTD report findings were released. The report incorporated a global assessment as well as five sub-global assessments. By taking a 'bottom-up' approach, the report aimed to understand the needs of those most vulnerable to threats to the security of their food and livelihood. Prior plenary sessions in Johannesburg aimed to come to agreement on the key priorities for each region.

A series of published (printed and web-based) critical, in-depth Global and Sub-global Assessments of local and institutional knowledge and experiences was produced. The assessment reports have been translated into the six official UN languages, presented, and discussed in multiple forums.

The reports created 'plausible scenarios', based on past events and existing trends such as population growth, rural/urban food and poverty dynamics, loss of agricultural land, water availability and climate change effects. Based around these issues, 'What if?' questions were formulated that allowed the implications of different technological options to be explored.

== See also ==
- Food security
