= Chemical transport model =

Type of computer numerical model

A chemical transport model (CTM) is a type of computer numerical model which typically simulates atmospheric chemistry and may be used for air pollution forecasting.

== Chemical transport models and general circulation models ==
While related general circulation models (GCMs) focus on simulating overall atmospheric dynamics (e.g. fluid and heat flows), a CTM instead focuses on the abundance and fluxes of one or more chemical species. Accordingly, a CTM must solve only the continuity equation for its species of interest while a GCM must solve all the primitive equations for the atmosphere. Hence, CTMs are potentially computationally much cheaper. However, a CTM will be expected to accurately represent the entire cycle for the species of interest, including emissions, fluxes (e.g. advection, convection), chemical production/loss, and deposition. The transport of species by the winds is computed by the model's advection scheme, which ideally conserves mass and avoids overshoots, numerical diffusion, and numerical dispersion. That being said, the tendency, especially as the cost of computing declines over time, is for GCMs to incorporate CTMs for species of special interest to climate dynamics, especially shorter-lived species such as nitrogen oxides and volatile organic compounds; this allows feedbacks from the CTM to the GCM's radiation calculations, and also allows the meteorological fields forcing the CTM to be updated at higher time resolution than may be practical in studies with offline CTMs.

== Types of chemical transport models ==
CTMs may be classified according to their methodology and their species of interest, as well as more generic characteristics (e.g. dimensionality, global or regional, degree of resolution).

=== Methodologies ===
Jacob (1999) classifies CTMs as Eulerian/"box" or Lagrangian/"puff" models, depending on whether the CTM in question focuses on

- (Eulerian) "boxes" through which fluxes, and in which chemical production/loss and deposition occur over time
- (Lagrangian) the production and motion of parcels of air ("puffs") over time

An Eulerian CTM solves its continuity equations using a global/fixed frame of reference, while a Lagrangian CTM uses a local/moving frame of reference.

==== See also ====
- discussion of gridding in CLaMS
- Lagrangian and Eulerian coordinates
- discussion of the continuity equation in Jacob's Introduction to Atmospheric Chemistry online

==== Examples of Eulerian Global CTMs ====
- TOMCAT/SLIMCAT
- GEOS-Chem
- MOZART: (Model for OZone And Related chemical Tracers) is developed jointly by the (US) National Center for Atmospheric Research (NCAR), the Geophysical Fluid Dynamics Laboratory (GFDL), and the Max Planck Institute for Meteorology (MPI-Met) to simulate changes in ozone concentrations in the Earth's atmosphere. MOZART was designed to simulate tropospheric chemical and transport processes, but has been extended (MOZART3) into the stratosphere and mesosphere. It can be driven by standard meteorological fields from, for example, the National Centers for Environmental Prediction (NCEP), the European Centre for Medium-Range Weather Forecasts (ECMWF) and the Global Modeling and Assimilation Office (GMAO), or by fields generated from general circulation models. MOZART4 improves MOZART2's chemical mechanisms, photolysis scheme, dry deposition mechanism, biogenic emissions and handling of tropospheric aerosols.

==== Examples of Eulerian Regional CTMs ====
- CCATT-BRAMS
- WRF-Chem
- CMAQ, CMAQ Website
- CAMx
- LOTOS-EUROS
- MATCH
- CHIMERE
- POLYPHEMUS
- TCAM (Transport Chemical Aerosol Model; TCAM): a mathematical modelling method (computer simulation) designed to model certain aspects of the Earth's atmosphere. TCAM is one of several chemical transport models, all of which are concerned with the movement of chemicals in the atmosphere, and are thus used in the study of air pollution.

TCAM is a multiphase three-dimensional eulerian grid model (as opposed to lagrangian or other modeling methods). It is designed for modelling dispersion of pollutants (in particular photochemical and aerosol) at mesoscales (medium scale, generally concerned with systems a few hundred kilometers in size).

TCAM was developed at the University of Brescia in Italy.

==== Examples of Lagrangian CTMs ====
- CLaMS
- FLEXPART

==== Examples of Semi-Lagrangian CTMs ====
- MOCAGE
- GEM-MACH

==== Examples of ozone CTMs ====
- CLaMS
- MOZART
- TOMCAT/SLIMCAT

== See also ==
- Atmospheric dispersion modeling
- List of atmospheric dispersion models
- University Corporation for Atmospheric Research
- National Center for Atmospheric Research
- Ozone depletion
- Meteorology
