= Modified Philip Dunne Infiltrometer =

Standardized method for measuring soil infiltration

The Modified Philip-Dunne Infiltrometer (MPD) is a standardized method for measuring the hydraulic conductivity of soil in the field. It is a falling head method outlined in ASTM International Standard D8152.

== Description and methodology ==
The MPD Infiltrometer consists of a cylinder with an inside diameter of 4 inches (10.16 cm) and a length of 17.5 inches (44.5 cm). The procedure involves inserting the cylinder 5 centimeters into the ground and filling it with one gallon of water. Water level readings are recorded at regular time intervals until the cylinder is drained. The collected data is then used to calculate the saturated hydraulic conductivity (Ksat) using the MPD equation specified in ASTM Standard D8152.

== Historical context ==
The MPD method builds upon earlier work in infiltration theory. The Green-Ampt theory, developed in 1911, provided a framework for estimating infiltration rates by incorporating factors like soil suction head, porosity, hydraulic conductivity, and time.

In 1993, Philip and Dunne expanded on this theory, developing a methodology using a water-filled cylinder to measure head drop over time. Their approach incorporated the Green-Ampt theory to calculate hydraulic conductivity, which eliminates the need for pre-saturating the ground with water.

== Refinement and standardization ==
The University of Minnesota subsequently modified Philip and Dunne's method by introducing a variation to the calculation in 2007. This refinement led to the renaming of the method as the Modified Philip-Dunne Infiltrometer (MPD). The revised methodology underwent peer review and in 2018, the MPD test was formally adopted as an ASTM International Standard. ASTM D8152.

== Peer reviews ==
The Nevada Tahoe Conservation District conducted a two-year study (2012–2014) of the Modified Philip Dunne Infiltrometer and compared the results of the MPD to the Constant Head Permeameter, Double Ring Infiltrometer, and the Tension Disc Infiltrometer. The purpose of the study was to determine if the MPD could be used as a faster method to test the hydraulic conductivity of the rain gardens in the Lake Tahoe Region. The results showed the MPD measurements were comparable to the other three test methods.

The authors of a 2019 study said "that the MPDI is a useful field method to estimate Ks values, but it is not a robust method to estimate Ψ values."

The Georgia Department of Transportation adopted the MPD method to conduct a study of road side infiltration practices (ditches), to determine the best slope and design of these practices to achieve maximum efficiency removing solid pollutants.

== Issues ==
Per ASTM D8152, the MPD method is not suitable in soils (clay) where infiltration is slower than 2.5 mm per hour.
