= TOMCAT/SLIMCAT =

TOMCAT/SLIMCAT is a global three-dimensional off-line chemical transport model (CTM), which models the time-dependent distribution of chemical species in the troposphere and stratosphere. It can be used to study topics such as ozone depletion and tropospheric pollution; it is cited extensively in the WMO/UNEP Scientific Assessments of Ozone Depletion and was one of the models used the IPCC report on Aviation and the Global Atmosphere . It is also used as a benchmark for results from complex chemistry-climate model simulations. TOMCAT incorporates a choice of detailed chemistry and aerosol schemes for the troposphere or stratosphere, an optional chemical data assimilation scheme and can be used in inverse mode (INVICAT) to estimate trace gas emissions.

The model, originally called the Toulouse Off-line Model of Chemistry And Transport (TOMCAT), was created by Martyn Chipperfield while working at Météo France. Development of the model then followed Chipperfield to the Universities of Cambridge and now Leeds. Here "off-line" means that when the meteorological data (wind components and other fields) used to drive the CTM are derived from a general circulation model (GCM), the CTM is run as a separate program outside of the GCM; this is as distinct from a chemistry-climate simulation scheme which runs within a GCM, in which the simulated chemical distributions, e.g. of ozone, can provide feedback on the meteorology via the GCM's radiation scheme. In practice, the meteorology use to force the TOMCAT/SLIMCAT is now taken mainly from meteorological reanalyses so that the model can be easily compared with real-world observations - a real strength of CTMs. TOMCAT/SLIMCAT was used extensively to test the performance of prototype ECMWF reanalyses and to show their suitability for decadal CTM simulations.

To ease computational costs, Chipperfield developed a stripped-down version called the Single Layer Isentropic Model of Chemistry And Transport (SLIMCAT) in 1995. This used a level of constant potential temperature (or equivalently, of constant specific entropy, hence isentropic), exploiting the fact that due to approximate conservation of energy, atmospheric motions are approximately adiabatic and hence air parcels remain on isentropic levels on short timescales. A diabatic heating scheme was later added, to create an alternative full-stratosphere 3-D model with multiple isentropic levels with transport between them on longer (up to multi-decadal) timescales. The name "SLIMCAT" has remained despite the multiple levels.

The two versions of the model were combined into the same library and are now maintained at the University of Leeds as a single code base, which runs in Fortran, and has been parallelised using Message Passing Interface (MPI) and OpenMP.

TOMCAT has been further extended to include a detailed treatment of aerosol. GLOMAP (Global Model of Aerosol Processes) simulates a wide range of aerosol species including black carbon, sulfate, sea spray, soil dust, and secondary organic aerosol. The primary purpose of TOMCAT-GLOMAP is to simulate aerosol radiative forcing and the impact of aerosol on climate. The GLOMAP aerosol code developed in the TOMCAT-GLOMAP CTM is now also used in the UK chemistry-climate-aerosol model UKCA.

TOMCAT is also used in inverse mode (INVICAT) to derive surface fluxes of greenhouse gases (GHGs) and halocarbons. INVICAT has been used to show that the Amazon is likely becoming an overall source of carbon to the atmosphere and that 'fracking' in the USA is likely increasing leaks of ethane and methane to the atmosphere.
