= Scientific Assessment of Ozone Depletion =

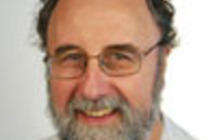
Sir Robert Watson played an important role in coordinating predecessors of the scientific assessments.

The Scientific Assessment of Ozone Depletion is a sequence of reports sponsored by WMO/UNEP. The most recent report is from 2026. The reports were set up to inform the Montreal Protocol and amendments about ozone depletion.

== Background ==
The Vienna Convention and Montreal Protocol were installed long before a scientific consensus was established. Until the 1980s, EU, NASA, NAS, UNEP, WMO and the British government had all issued further different scientific reports with dissenting conclusions. Sir Robert (Bob) Watson, Director of the Science Division of at National Aeronautics and Space Administration (NASA), played a crucial role in achieving unified reporting. The IPCC started from scratch with a more unified approach.

== Findings ==
=== Changes in Ozone-Depleting Compounds ===
- In the troposphere observations show that the total abundance of ozone-depleting compounds continues to decline slowly from the peak that occurred in 1992-1994.
- Observations in the stratosphere indicate that the total chlorine abundance is at or near a peak, while bromine abundances are probably still increasing.
- Analyses of air trapped in snow since the late 19th century have confirmed that non-industrial sources of the CFCs, halons, and major chlorocarbons were insignificant. The data suggest that substantial natural sources exist for atmospheric methyl bromide (CH_{3}Br).
- The abundances of HCFCs in the troposphere continue to increase.
- water vapour is a greenhouse gas that has a greater overall effect on the ozone layer than carbon dioxide because of its higher concentrations but is not affected by human activities as it is caused mainly by evaporation and condensation rates.

=== Changes in the Ozone Layer over the Poles and Globally ===
- Springtime Antarctic ozone depletion due to halogens has been large (40-50%; exceptionally 70%) throughout the last decade.
- In some recent cold Arctic winters during the last decade, maximum total column ozone losses due to halogens have reached 30%, but in warmer winters Arctic ozone loss is small.
- Ozone remains depleted in the midlatitudes of both hemispheres. The global-average total column ozone amount for the period 1997-2001 was approximately 3% below the pre-1980 average values.
- Models capture the observed long-term ozone changes in northern and southern midlatitudes.

=== Predictions ===
- Chemistry-climate models predict that springtime Antarctic ozone levels will be increasing by 2010 because of projected decreases of halogens in the stratosphere. A return to pre-1980 total column ozone amounts in the Antarctic is expected by the middle of this century.
- Arctic ozone depletion is highly variable and difficult to predict, but a future Arctic polar ozone hole similar to that of the Antarctic appears unlikely.

=== Changes in Ultraviolet Radiation ===
- Decreases in ozone amounts lead to increases in UV radiation. Calculations of UV irradiance based on relationships with total ozone and total irradiance suggest that UV irradiance has increased since the early 1980s by 6-14% at more than 10 sites distributed over mid- and high latitudes of both hemispheres. But complexities (e.g. clouds, aerosol, snow cover, sea ice cover, and total ozone) limit the ability to describe fully surface ultraviolet radiation on the global scale. Surface ultraviolet data records, which started in the early 1990s, are still too short and too variable to permit the calculation of statistically significant long-term (i.e., multidecadal) trends.
- However, estimates of surface UV radiation from satellite data (ozone and cloud cover) started in November 1978 with the launch of Nimbus-7/TOMS (Total Ozone Mapping Spectrometer) followed by Meteor-3/TOMS in 1991, Earth-Probe/TOMS in 1996, and by OMI (Ozone Measuring Instrument on the EOS/AURA spacecraft) in July 2004. These time series are sufficient for estimates of multidecade trends in ozone, cloud cover, and UV irradiance. The results clearly show that there have been significant increases in surface UVB at latitudes greater than about 40 degrees (northern US and Canada, most of Europe, Russia, and the southernmost portions of Argentina and Chile). The percent increase depends on the wavelength, with shorter wavelengths showing a larger percent increase.
- Exposure to UV irradiance reaching the Earth's surface is also affected by the amount of cloud cover and by the altitude above sea level. These factors affect both UVA and UVB in nearly the same manner (less cloud cover or higher altitudes increase UV radiation at the Earth's surface). Some countries, such as Australia, have much less cloud cover than comparable sites in the Northern Hemisphere, and have much greater daily exposure to UV radiation. Australia, in particular, is known for health effects associated with UV exposure, and has a vigorous public health program to combat this problem. Satellite reflectivity data (TOMS) suggests that some populated regions (e.g., central Europe) have experienced small decreases in cloudiness, which would contribute to overall UV increases.

== Reports ==
- WMO/UNEP Scientific Assessment of Ozone Depletion: 2026
- WMO/UNEP Scientific Assessment of Ozone Depletion: 2022
- WMO/UNEP Scientific Assessment of Ozone Depletion: 2018
- WMO/UNEP Scientific Assessment of Ozone Depletion: 2014
- WMO/UNEP Scientific Assessment of Ozone Depletion: 2010
- WMO/UNEP Scientific Assessment of Ozone Depletion: 2006
- WMO/UNEP Scientific Assessment of Ozone Depletion: 2002
- WMO/UNEP Scientific Assessment of Ozone Depletion: 1998
- WMO/UNEP Scientific Assessment of Ozone Depletion: 1994
- Scientific Assessment of Ozone Depletion: 1991. WMO No. 25.
- Scientific Assessment of Stratospheric Ozone: 1989. 2 vol. WMO No. 20.
- (International Ozone Trends Panel Report 1988. 2 vol. WMO No. 18.)
- (Atmospheric Ozone 1985. 3 vol. WMO No. 16.)
- (The Stratosphere 1981 Theory and Measurements. WMO No. 11.)

(The bracketed 1988, 1985 and 1981 papers are precursor reports relevant to the Montreal Protocol but not directly part of this series).
