= Roughness length =

Parameter of some vertical wind profile equations

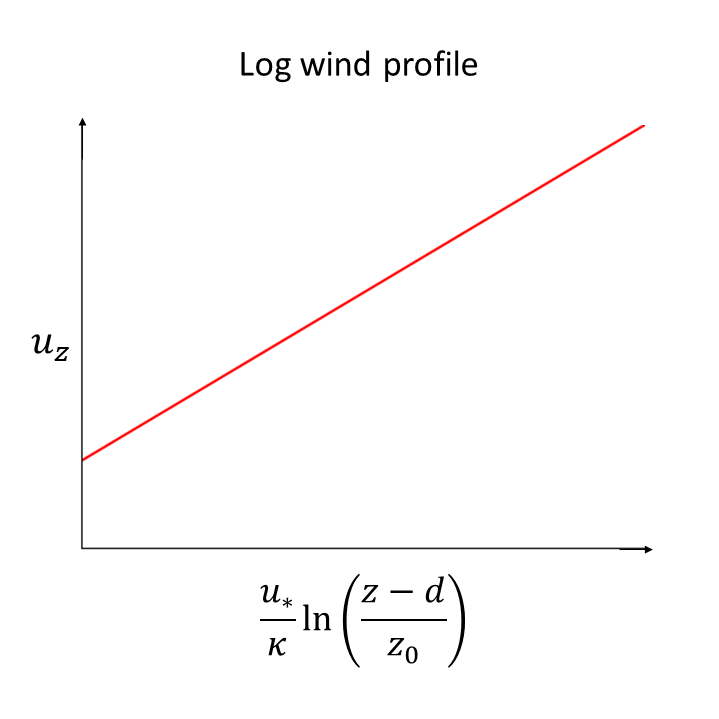
A plot of a typical log wind profile under statically neutral conditions. The roughness length plays a part in determining the slope of the line.

Roughness length ($z_0$) is a parameter used when modeling the horizontal mean wind speed near the ground. In wind vertical profile such the log wind profile, the roughness length (with dimension of length and SI unit of metres) is equivalent to the height at which the wind speed theoretically becomes zero in the absence of wind-slowing obstacles and under neutral conditions. In reality, the wind at this height no longer follows a logarithm. It is so named because it is typically related to the height of terrain roughness elements (i.e. protrusions from and/or depressions into the surface). For instance, forests tend to have much larger roughness lengths than tundra. The roughness length does not exactly correspond to any physical length; however, it can be considered as a length-scale representation of the roughness of the surface.

== Mathematical foundation ==
The roughness length $z_0$ appears in the expression for the mean wind speed $u_z$ near the ground derived using the Monin–Obukhov similarity theory:

$u_z = \frac{u_*}{\kappa} \left[\ln \left(\frac{z-d}{z_0} \right) + \psi \left(\frac{z-d-z_0}{L} \right)\right],$

where

- $u_*$ is the friction velocity
- $\kappa$ is the Von Kármán constant
- $z$ is the elevation (as measured from the ground)
- $d$ is the elevation of the displacement plane (as measured from the ground), which is an offset that accounts for wind-slowing obstacles such as buildings, trees, or any other structures which impede flow
- $L$ is the Monin-Obukhov length (which is defined to be the height at which buoyancy and wind shear are equally effective at creating turbulence)
- $\psi$ is a correction factor for stability, with $\psi = 0$ indicating statically neutral conditions. Conditions are statically neutral when the temperature of the air monotonically increases with elevation.

In the simplest possible case (statically neutral conditions and no wind-slowing obstacles), the mean wind speed simplifies to:

$u_z = \frac{u_*}{\kappa} \ln \left(\frac{z}{z_0} \right).$

This provides a method to calculate the roughness length by measuring the friction velocity and the mean wind velocity (at known elevation) in a given, relatively flat location (under neutral conditions) using an anemometer. In this simplified form, the log wind profile is identical in form to the dimensional law of the wall.

If the friction velocity is unknown, one can calculate the surface roughness as follows

$z_0=\exp\left(\frac{u(z_2)\ln(z_1)-u(z_1)\ln(z_2)}{u(z_2)-u(z_1)}\right)$

Due to the limitation of observation instruments and the theory of mean values, the levels (z) should be chosen where there is enough difference between the measurement readings. If one has more than two readings, the measurements can be fit to the above equation to find the roughness length. When calculating the surface roughness, the displacement height can be neglected.

== Application ==
As an approximation, the roughness length is approximately one-tenth of the height of the surface roughness elements. For example, short grass of height 0.01 meters has a roughness length of approximately 0.001 meters. Surfaces are rougher if they have more protrusions (e.g. a forest has a larger roughness length than a tundra). Roughness length is an important concept in urban meteorology because tall structures, such as skyscrapers, affect roughness length and wind patterns.

Terrain description	$z_0$ (m)
Open sea, Fetch at least 5 km	0.0002
Mud flats, snow; no vegetation, no obstacles	0.005
Open flat terrain; grass, few isolated obstacles	0.03
Low crops; occasional large obstacles, x/H > 20	0.10
High crops; scattered obstacles, 15 < x/H < 20	0.25
parkland, bushes; numerous obstacles, x/H ≈ 10	0.5
Regular large obstacle coverage (suburb, forest)	1.0
City centre with high- and low-rise buildings	≥ 2

For urban areas, the roughness length changes with the wind direction

== Relation to other roughness measures ==
The roughness length is one of many possible measures of the roughness of a surface. For example, in classical mechanics the coefficient of friction is commonly used to measure the roughness of a surface as it relates to the force exerted on another contacted object. And, in fluid dynamics, hydraulic roughness is a measure of the resistance water experiences when flowing over land or through a channel. All of these measures ultimately derive from frictional forces, which result from irregularities on the surfaces of relevance.

== See also ==
- Von Kármán constant
- Monin-Obukhov length
- Wind profile power laws
