= Jalpaiguri Government Engineering College =

Public engineering college in West Bengal, India

Jalpaiguri Government Engineering College (JGEC)
- Jalpaigurī Sārkāri Abhiyāntrikī Mahāvidyālaya
- Seal of the Jalpaiguri Government Engineering College (JGEC)
- Former name: Jalpaiguri Engineering College (1961-1963)
- Motto: Sa Vidya Ya Vimuktaye
- Type: Public Engineering College
- Established: 7 August 1961; 65 years ago
- Founder: Government of West Bengal
- Accreditation: AICTE; NAAC; NBA
- Affiliations: MAKAUT
- Budget: ₹157.50 crore (US$16 million) (FY2026–27 est.)
- Chairperson: Dr. Omprakash Mishra
- Principal: Dr. Amitava Ray
- Dean: Sukla Sheet
- Visitor: Governor of West Bengal
- Academic staff: 77 (2024–2025)
- Students: 1,510 (2024–2025)
- Undergraduates: 1,459 (2024–2025)
- Postgraduates: 38 (2024–2025)
- Doctoral students: 13 (2024–2025)
- Location: Danguajhar, Near National Highway 27 (WB SH 12A), Jalpaiguri, West Bengal, 735102; 26°32′47″N 88°42′13″E
- Campus: 168 acre (Main campus)
- Language: English
- Colours
- Nicknames: Jolu (College) & Jolites (Students)
- Website: www.jgec.ac.in
- Location within West Bengal

Jalpaiguri Government Engineering College (Autonomous), abbreviated as JGEC, is a premier public institute for quality technical education in India. Established on 7 August 1961, it is a fully Autonomous Government Engineering college. It holds the distinction of being the second oldest engineering college in West Bengal. The courses offered by JGEC have the approval of the All India Council for Technical Education (AICTE) and are accredited by the National Board of Accreditation (NBA). JGEC is also an NAAC accredited institute. The college became the first institution in North Bengal to organize a TEDx event, marking a significant milestone in the region’s academic and intellectual landscape. The college is known for making industry ready engineers and future leaders. The institute has produced many talented engineers till date. The vision of the Institute is to achieve Centre of Excellence in the field of Engineering & Technology for creating dynamic human resources of global standards with capabilities of accepting new challenges.

== History ==
Established in 1961, the institution initially began as Jalpaiguri Engineering College and was not fully administered by the Government of West Bengal during its earliest years. In 1963, the state government decided to assume full control of the institute, partly to address administrative challenges related to hostel accommodation and student welfare. Following this decision, the college was officially renamed Jalpaiguri Government Engineering College, marking its transition into a government engineering institution. Contemporary newspaper reports the following day announced the change, formally recognizing the institute as the first engineering college in the North Bengal region. In 1998, during severe flooding in the Jalpaiguri region, the hostels of the college were used as temporary shelter, where many local residents were accommodated and assisted.

JGEC Central building in Initial years was under the University of Calcutta. For the period between 1963 and 1999, the college was affiliated to the University of North Bengal, which handed over to the West Bengal University of Technology. Founded under the West Bengal University of Technology Act, 2000.

On 03rd January, 2012, the institution was granted Autonomous status by the University Grants Commission (UGC), thus giving it the freedom to set its own curriculum and manage its own finances.

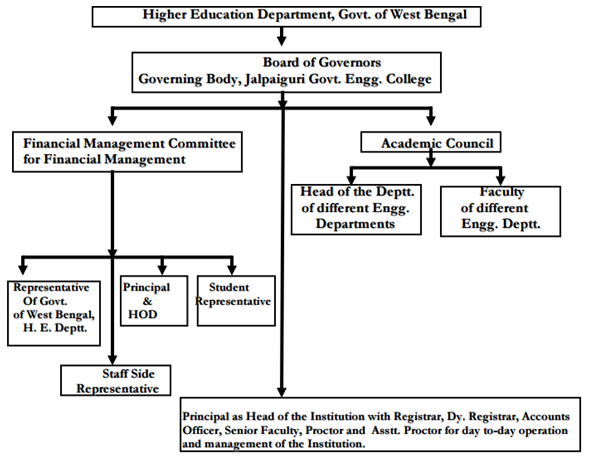
organizational administrative structure of JGEC

== Rise of JGEC ==
=== 1. Early Phase (1961–1980) ===
In the Year 1961 Government of West Bengal to expand engineering education in North Bengal. At that time, most engineering colleges in the state were concentrated around Kolkata, so students from North Bengal had limited opportunities.

The college initially started with three core branches:

•Civil Engineering

•Mechanical Engineering

•Electrical Engineering

During its early years, the institute was affiliated with University of Calcutta.

The infrastructure in the early period was limited, but the college gradually developed laboratories, academic buildings, and hostels on its large campus in Jalpaiguri.

=== 2. Development Phase (1980–2000) ===
During this period the institute expanded academically and infrastructurally. Major developments included:

• Introduction of new engineering branches such as Computer Science and Electronics.

• Improvement of laboratory and research facilities.

• Growth of hostel facilities and student activities.

• Strengthening of the alumni network.

Because of its strong academics and government support, JGEC became one of the most respected engineering colleges in West Bengal.

3. Modern Era (2000–Present)

In the 21st century, the college expanded further. Key changes:

• In 2012, the institution was granted Autonomous status, enabling it to design its own curriculum and academic regulations while remaining affiliation shifted to Maulana Abul Kalam Azad University of Technology.

• New programs such as M.Tech was introduced.

• The campus developed into a 168-acre academic environment with hostels, sports grounds, and clubs.

The college built a strong placement record and alumni presence in major companies and public sector organizations.

4. Current Reputation

Today Jalpaiguri Government Engineering College is widely recognized as:

• One of the oldest engineering colleges in West Bengal.

• A major technical education hub in North Bengal.

• A preferred choice for many students in WBJEE counselling.

The institute continues to contribute engineers, researchers, and technical professionals across India and abroad.

== Ranking ==
In 2009 The Telegraph ranked Jalpaiguri Government Engineering college to be 3rd among the engineering colleges in the state of West Bengal in factors like infrastructure, placement record and faculty.

=== UG Programmes ===
1. WBJEE (West Bengal Joint Entrance Examination) conducted by West Bengal Joint Entrance Board for admission in Bachelor of Technology (B.Tech)
2. JELET (Joint Entrance Examination for Lateral Entry) conducted by West Bengal Joint Entrance Board for admission in lateral entry in 2nd year (3rd semester) of the four-year course of bachelor's degree in technology.

=== PG Programmes ===
1. PGET (Post Graduate Entrance Test) Conducted by PGET Board as constituted by the Maulana Abul Kalam Azad University of Technology, West Bengal for admission in Master of Technology (M.Tech)
2. GATE (Graduate Aptitude Test in Engineering)

== Academic programs ==
Academic Programs and Laboratories
Department	Established	Course/ Program	Laboratories
Computer Science and Engineering	2000	UG, PhD	Basics of Computer and Communications Lab, Object Oriented Programming Lab, Operating Systems Lab, DBMS Lab, Graphics and Multimedia Lab, EDUSAT Lab, Compiler Design Lab, Artificial Intelligence Lab
Information Technology	2000	UG, PhD	Computer Organization Lab, Data Structures Lab, Operating Systems Lab, Networking Lab, Database Lab, Programming Lab
Electronics and Communication Engineering	2000	UG, PhD	Power Electronics Lab, Digital & Analog Communication Lab, VLSI Lab, Microprocessor Lab, Digital Signal Processing Lab, Antenna & Transmission Lines Lab, Microwave & Satellite Communication Lab
Electrical Engineering	1961	UG, PG & PhD	Basic Electrical Engineering, Circuit Theory Electrical Machines, Power Systems, Electrical Measurements, Control Systems, Microprocessors, Simulation, Power Electronics and Drives
Mechanical Engineering	1961	UG, PG & PhD	Workshops: Carpentry Shop, Moulding Shop, Machine Shop, Forging Shop, Fitting Shop, Welding Shop, IC Engine Laboratory, Fluid Laboratory, CAD/CAM/CNC Programming Laboratory, Thermal Laboratory, Solid Mechanics Lab, Manufacturing and Instrumentation Lab
Civil Engineering	1961	UG, PhD	Concrete Technology, Strength of Materials/Structural Engineering, Soil Mechanics, Highway Engineering, Engineering Survey, Water Resource Engineering, Environment Engineering, Engineering Geology, Computer Laboratory

== Student life ==
=== JGEC Hostels ===
JGEC provides five hostels on campus to accommodate about 75% of its students. Out of them, four are for male boarders and the last for female boarders. The hostels are as follows:

- Hostel 1 (P. C. Roy Hall)
- Hostel 2 (J. C. Bose Hall)
- Hostel 3 (N. C. Bose Hall)
- Hostel 4 (S. N. Bose Hall)
- Hostel 5 (Ladies' Hostel)

Each hostel has its own mess managed by own duly elected mess committee which works under the hostel superintendent. Applications for hostel boarding are accepted at the time of admission.

=== Clubs ===
==== Centre For Innovation ====
CFI is the Technical Society of JGEC. It has been promoting technical knowledge of the students since its establishment (2010). Along with conduction of classes, CFI deals with projects and provides adequate support to carry out the same.

Events: ICIC, Sristi (Tech Exhibition)

=== Atelier (Photography Club) ===
ATELIER Photography Club, established in 1988, is the official visual arts and media society of Jalpaiguri Government Engineering College, carrying a proud legacy of creative excellence, visual storytelling, and cinematic innovation through photowalks, exhibitions, workshops, and inter-college competitions across North Bengal.

Events: Photowalk, Inter-College Photography & Videography Competition, Short Film Competition.

=== JGEC Sports Club ===
Sports Club is the official athletics and games club of Jalpaiguri Government Engineering College, fostering excellence, unity, and an indomitable competitive spirit through cricket, football, and volleyball, proudly competing under its iconic slogan jitbe_jolu.

Events: College Premier League (CPL), Inter- College Cricket, football & Volleyball matches.

==== Divide & Conquer(Coders club) ====
Divide & Conquer is a group of enthusiastic coders from JGEC. The club has its own Campus CodeChef Chapter (CodeChef JGEC Chapter)

Events Organised Aarambh and Code Chronicles

==== Wavezz (Dance Club Of JGEC) ====
Wavezz – The Dance Club is the official dance club of Jalpaiguri Government Engineering College, dedicated to celebrating rhythm, creativity, and stage excellence through dynamic performances, professional workshops, and vibrant cultural showcases throughout the academic year.

==== Calliphony (Music Club) ====
Calliphony – The Music Club is the official music club of Jalpaiguri Government Engineering College, nurturing melody, harmony, and artistic passion through live performances, jam sessions, workshops, and cultural showcases across diverse musical genres.

==== JYOTI ====
"JYOTI -A Ray Of Hope" is a free night school for under-privileged students, run by the students of JGEC. It was started in the year 2010. Students from classes 3 to 10, come to Jyoti for gaining knowledge and to get a proper pathway for their studies. Jyoti has also started the preparation for Navodaya Scholarship exam for students of class 5 to 10. Activities: Regular Surveys, Health camps, performances by students in cultural events.

==== Pandulipi (Magazine Club of JGEC) ====
Magazine Club of Jalpaiguri Government Engineering College is one of the biggest writing platform in the North Bengal founded in 1969. Pandulipi is the annual magazine of JGEC. Magazine Club of Jalpaiguri Govt. Engineering College invites everyone to be a part of it. This has become a platform for all young writer's to think and pen down their thoughts. We invite all Institutions to be a Part of it.

==== Entrepreneurship Development Cell of JGEC ====
The motive of Entrepreneurship Development Cell, JGEC is to promote entrepreneurship, start ups and provide a platform for students in and beyond the campus to portray their capabilities in the techno-business industries.

Events: TEDX JGEC, E-Summit, B-plan.

=== Festivals ===
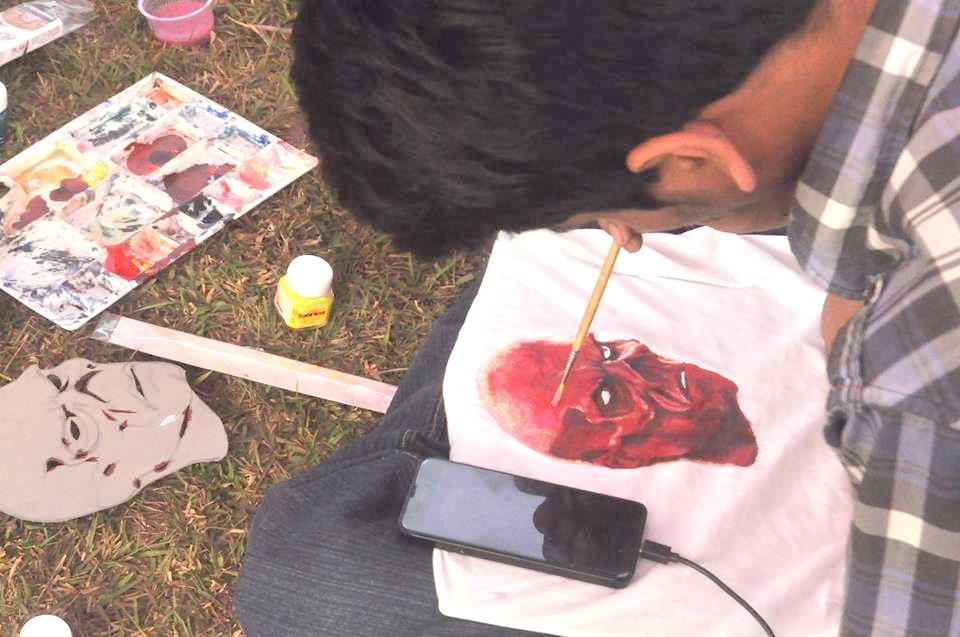
T-shirt painting competition in JECLAT 2016

JECLAT (Cultural Fest of JGEC)

Jeclat is the annual cultural festival of Jalpaiguri Government Engineering College (JGEC). Recognized as the biggest cultural fest of North Bengal, JECLAT is a seven-day grand celebration of art, music, dance, fashion, and youth creativity.

Organized entirely by the students of JGEC, jeclat serves as a dynamic platform that attracts participants and audiences from engineering colleges, universities, and institutions across West Bengal and neighboring regions. The festival transforms the expansive 168-acre campus into a vibrant cultural arena featuring professionally managed stages, large-scale lighting setups, and high-energy performances.

Spanning over seven days, JECLAT hosts a diverse lineup of events including:

- Band competitions and live concerts
- Solo and group dance championships
- Fashion shows and ramp walks
- DJ nights and celebrity performances
- Literary and cultural competitions
- Informal and fun events

JECLAT is exclusively a cultural fest, focusing on artistic excellence and entertainment rather than technical exhibitions. Over the years, it has established itself as a hallmark of youth expression, leadership, and large-scale event management in North Bengal.

The festival represents the spirit, unity, and creative power of JGEC students, making JECLAT not just a college fest, but a regional cultural phenomenon.

JECLAT includes social and cultural competitions like Wall Painting competition, T-shirt painting competition, Sudoku, Creative writing, Roadies, Treasure Hunt, Chitrayan (photography & art exhibition and competition), Damsheraz (dumb charades), Dance Fest (inter-college dance competition), Music Fest (inter-college music competition), Band Blast (band music contest), Elementary (puzzle, quiz, etc. online contests) in addition to stage shows.

SRISTI (Techno Management Fest of JGEC)

Sristi is the annual techno-management festival of Jalpaiguri Government Engineering College (JGEC), organized by the students of the institution. It's the biggest techno management fest of North Bengal. The festival features a variety of technical and managerial events, attracting participation from colleges across the region.

Technical events have included competitions such as CodeCronicals (competitive programming), CSS Battle, JCTF (Capture the Flag), Instridge, Bridge The Gap, Rotolare, RoboSoccer, Mazemarize, Robowar, Circuitrix, and Sputnik.

Management-oriented events cover areas such as business and communication, with activities like B-Plan (business plan presentation), debates, Code Hunt, photography contests, and research paper presentations, Gamming events, Teczibition.

Each event typically has its own prize pool, and the festival often incorporates workshops, exhibitions, and cultural programs alongside the competitions.

== Alumni ==
JGEC has various Alumni Associations set up at different places. The Alumni Association conducts seminars, and workshops at campus, arrange platform for sponsoring scholarships and sporting events around the whole year. Prominent educationalists and professionals visit campus during seminars organized by the Alumni Association. The Association works in close association with students of JGEC and the college authorities. The Alumni Association also helps the family of distressed Alumni or current students of JGEC financially through 'Distressed Fund' of the Association. Inter-class cricket tournament-'El Equipo', is one of the sporting event at JGEC organized and sponsored by the Alumni Association.

=== Notable alumni ===
- Promode R. Bandyopadhyay, inventor and senior research scientist at Naval Undersea Warfare Center, Rhode Island, USA.
- Vincent Pala, Member of the Indian Parliament for Shillong.
- Subhashis Dey, Recipient of Hans Albert Einstein Award, 2022
- Shankar Guha Niyogi, Tread Union leader and political activist

== See also ==
- List of institutions of higher education in West Bengal
- Education in India
- Education in West Bengal
