= Promode R. Bandyopadhyay =

Inventor & research scientist

- প্রমোদ বন্দ্যোপাধ্যায়
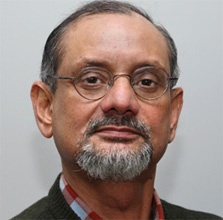
- Born: Jalpaiguri, West Bengal, India
- Citizenship: United States of America
- Education: Jalpaiguri Government Engineering College (University of North Bengal) (B.E.); Bengal Engineering & Science University, Shibpur (M.E); IIT Madras (Phd.); University of Cambridge (Phd.)
- Scientific career
- Fields: Fluid Mechanics
- Workplaces: Naval Undersea Warfare Center, Formerly University of Rhode Island and University of Cambridge

Promode R. Bandyopadhyay is an Indian born American inventor, research scientist and Technical Program Manager at the Naval Undersea Warfare Center, Newport, Rhode Island, USA. He was a Program Officer at the Cognitive, Neural and Biomolecular Science and Technology Division of the Human Systems Science and Technology Department of the Office of Naval Research (2000–2002). He was a Post-Doctoral Researcher at Cambridge University Engineering Department and University of Houston.

He is a Fellow of the American Society of Mechanical Engineers (ASME), a Fellow of Wolfson College, Cambridge, an associate fellow of the American Institute of Aeronautics and Astronautics (AIAA), a Member of the Institute of Electrical and Electronics Engineers (IEEE), and a Life Member of the American Physical Society (APS).

He currently holds 17 approved U.S. Patents and more than 5 pending U.S. Patents. He is also an author at SPIE.

== Education and career ==
He holds bachelor's degree from the Jalpaiguri Government Engineering College (Formerly affiliated to University of North Bengal) (1968), master's degree from Bengal Engineering & Science University, Shibpur (1970) and doctorate degrees from the University of Cambridge (1978) and Indian Institute of Technology, Madras (1974).

He is currently a senior research scientist at the Naval Undersea Warfare Center, Newport, Rhode Island, US. He was a program officer at the Cognitive, Neural and Biomolecular Science and Technology Division of the Human Systems Science and Technology Department, U.S. Office of Naval Research (2000–2002). He was a postdoctoral researcher at the Engineering Department, Cambridge University and the University of Houston, Houston, TX, US.

He was an adjunct professor at the mechanical engineering department of Old Dominion University, and the electrical engineering department of the University of Rhode Island. He has supervised postdoctorates and co-supervised MS theses. Several professors from Massachusetts Institute of Technology, Notre Dame University, University of Nevada, Las Vegas and Texas A&M University have worked with him as Visiting Summer Faculties.

He was an associate editor of the ASME Journal of Fluids Engineering and AIAA Journal, and a guest editor of the IEEE Journal of Oceanic Engineering. Currently, he is a member of the editorial board of Scientific Reports.

== Inventions and research ==
He holds 17 patents, has written 7 review and over 60 journal articles, four of which are cited in 12 text books. He has been cited by over 3331 against 172 publications/papers till date. Quite notably, one of his papers titled 'New aspects of turbulent boundary-layer structure' (1981) has been cited by over 800 till date and another paper titled 'Trends in biorobotic autonomous undersea vehicles' (2005) has been cited by over 329 till date.

Dr. Bandyopadhyay leads a multi-disciplinary engineering group in mentoring and bridging of biological sciences and naval engineering. His efforts have led to the maturing of sciences into emergent technologies such as Flapping Fin Propulsion Technology, Microbial Fuel Cells for littoral powering of instruments, and the demonstration of underwater propulsion using olivo-cerebellar dynamic controllers. He led the US-Russia-UK research team on compliant coating drag reduction. His Cambridge work (with M R Head)—known worldwide as a classic experiment—clearly showed the preponderance of hairpin vortices in turbulent boundary layers and the Reynolds number thinning effects.

His inventions include High Speed Underwater Data Transmission Method, Photo-receptor for electro-magnetic radiation collection, and 15 other inventions.

== Awards and honors ==
- ASME Fluids Engineering Division 90th Anniversary Commemorative Special Medal 2016.
- ASME Fluids Engineering Award 2015.
- Top Navy Scientist Award 2006.
- ASME Freeman Scholar Award 2006.
- 2006 Naval Sea Systems Command Division Newport Excellence in Science Award.
- NASA Technology Utilization & Application Award 1993.
