= Susil Ranjan Chattopadhyay =

Indian politician

Dr. Susil Ranjan Chattopadhyay

Member of Parliament, Lok Sabha
- In office 1952-1957
- Constituency: West Dinajpur, West Bengal

Personal details
- Born: 18 December 1898 Balurghat, West Dinajpur district, Bengal Presidency, British India
- Party: Indian National Congress
- Spouse: Belarani Chatterjee (m. 16 April 1923)
- Children: 1. G. Chatterjee; 2. Manabendra Chatterjee 3. Jyotirindra Chatterjee 4. Bibekananda Chatterjee; 5. Nandita Chatterjee Sarkar

Dr. Susil Ranjan Chattopadhyay was an Indian politician. He was elected to the Lok Sabha, lower house of the Parliament of India from West Dinajpur, West Bengal as a member of the Indian National Congress.

He was educated at Balurghat High School, and later at Calcutta Medical College.
