= Log wind profile =

Wind model

The log wind profile is a semi-empirical relationship commonly used to describe the vertical distribution of horizontal mean wind speed within the lowest portion of the planetary boundary layer (PBL). The logarithmic profile of wind speeds is generally limited to the lowest 100 m of the atmosphere (i.e., the surface layer of the atmospheric boundary layer). The rest of the atmosphere is composed of the remaining part of the PBL (up to around 1 km) and the troposphere or free atmosphere. In the free atmosphere, geostrophic wind relationships should be used, instead.

== Formulation ==
The equation to estimate the mean wind speed ($u_z$) at height $z$ (meters) above the ground is:

$$u_z = \frac{u_*}{\kappa} \left[\ln \left(\frac{z-d}{z_0} \right) + \psi(z,z_0,L)\right]$$

where $u_*$ is the friction velocity (m s^{−1}), $\kappa$ is the Von Kármán constant (~0.41), $d$ is the zero plane displacement (in metres), $z_0$ is the surface roughness (in meters), and $\psi$ is a stability term where $L$ is the Obukhov length from Monin-Obukhov similarity theory. Under neutral stability conditions, $z/L = 0$ and $\psi$ drops out and the equation is simplified to,

$$u_z = \frac{u_*}{\kappa} \left[\ln \left(\frac{z-d}{z_0} \right)\right]$$.

Zero-plane displacement ($d$) is the height in meters above the ground at which zero mean wind speed is achieved as a result of flow obstacles such as trees or buildings. This displacement can be approximated as ^{2}/_{3} to ^{3}/_{4} of the average height of the obstacles. For example, if estimating winds over a forest canopy of height 30 m, the zero-plane displacement could be estimated as d = 20 m.

Roughness length ($z_0$) is a corrective measure to account for the effect of the roughness of a surface on wind flow. That is, the value of the roughness length depends on the terrain. The exact value is subjective and references indicate a range of values, making it difficult to give definitive values. In most cases, references present a tabular format with the value of $z_0$ given for certain terrain descriptions. For example, for very flat terrain (snow, desert) the roughness length may be in the range 0.001 to 0.005 m. Similarly, for open terrain (grassland) the typical range is 0.01-0.05 m. For cropland, and brush/forest the ranges are 0.1-0.25 m and 0.5-1.0 m respectively. When estimating wind loads on structures the terrains may be described as suburban or dense urban, for which the ranges are typically 0.1-0.5 m and 1-5 m respectively.

In order to estimate the mean wind speed at one height (${{z}_{2}}$) based on that at another (${{z}_{1}}$), the formula would be rearranged,

$$u({{z}_{2}})=u({{z}_{1}})\frac{\ln \left( ({{z}_{2}}-d)/{{z}_{0}} \right)}{\ln \left( ({{z}_{1}}-d)/{{z}_{0}} \right)}$$,

where $u({{z}_{1}})$ is the mean wind speed at height ${{z}_{1}}$.

== Limits ==
The log wind profile is generally considered to be a more reliable estimator of mean wind speed than the wind profile power law in the lowest 10–20 m of the planetary boundary layer. Between 20 m and 100 m both methods can produce reasonable predictions of mean wind speed in neutral atmospheric conditions. From 100 m to near the top of the atmospheric boundary layer the power law produces more accurate predictions of mean wind speed (assuming neutral atmospheric conditions).

The neutral atmospheric stability assumption discussed above is reasonable when the hourly mean wind speed at a height of 10 m exceeds 10 m/s where turbulent mixing overpowers atmospheric instability.

== Applications ==
Log wind profiles are generated and used in many atmospheric pollution dispersion models.

== See also ==
- Wind profile power law
- List of atmospheric dispersion models
