= Shankar Guha Niyogi =

Indian trade unionist and social worker

Comrade Shankar Guha Niyogi

Personal details
- Born: Dhiresh Guha Niyogi; 14 February 1943
- Died: 28 September 1991 (aged 48)
- Cause of death: Murdered
- Spouse: Asha Guha Niyogi
- Occupation: Activist

Shankar Guha Niyogi (14 February 1943 – 28 September 1991) was an Indian labor leader who was the founder of the Chhattisgarh Mukti Morcha, a labor union run in the town of Dalli Rajhara Mines in Chhattisgarh, India.

== Early life ==
Guha Niyogi was born as Dhiresh Guha Niyogi in Naogaon district of Assam. He completed his schooling in Asansol and associated with communist leaders during his student life. He was also associated with the Food Movement in West Bengal in 1959. Guha Niyogi joined in Jalpaiguri Government Engineering College but did not finish his study. He started his career as coke oven operation in Bhilai Steel Plant.

== Movements ==
Guha Niyogi was the founder of Chhattisgarh Mukti Morcha, a political party for his vision towards labour of Rajhara Mines. At a young age, Niyogi came to Bhilai and became involved in the struggles of steel workers. He became a popular and legendary figure of anti liquor movements in Chhattisgarh. During The Emergency in India he was arrested and imprisoned several times due to the labour movements that he was a part of. He established Shaheed Hospital in Bhilai for the Mine and other workers.

== Death ==
Niyogi was shot and killed while asleep on 28 September 1991 in his house. The trial of his murder suspects generated tremendous controversy, as a lower court awarded strict punishments to all suspects, but higher courts only let the sentence of one convict stand, and let off two industrialists.
