= Sanjay Hansda =

Indian banker and economist

Executive Director, Reserve Bank of India
- Incumbent
- Assumed office 3 March 2025
- Governor: Sanjay Malhotra

Chief General Manager, Reserve Bank of India
- In office 2020–2022
- Governor: Shaktikanta Das

Personal details
- Born: Balurghat, West Bengal, India
- Education: University of North Bengal (B.A.); Jawaharlal Nehru University (M.A.); University of Mumbai; Jamnalal Bajaj Institute of Management Studies
- Occupation: Central banker, Economist

Sanjay Hansda is an Indian central banker and economist who serves as an Executive Director of the Reserve Bank of India (RBI). He has held senior roles in economic research, monetary policy, and public debt management, and has represented India at the International Monetary Fund (IMF).

== Early life and education ==
Sanjay Hansda completed his schooling at Balurghat High School. He then graduated from the University of North Bengal and post-graduated in economics from the Jawaharlal Nehru University. He also hold a diploma holder in financial services management from Jamnalal Bajaj Institute of Management Studies, University of Mumbai.

== Career ==
Hansda has held several senior positions at the Reserve Bank of India. He served as Chief General Manager and Adviser between 2020 and 2022. Earlier, he worked as Director in the Department of Economic and Policy Research and the Internal Debt Management Department.

In 2007, he was seconded to the Bank of England as an analyst in the area of financial stability. He later served as senior advisor and member of the executive board (India) at the International Monetary Fund. In March 2025, he was appointed executive director in the Department of Economic and Policy Research of the RBI.
