= Parthasarathi Chakraborty =

Indian geochemist

- Born: 24 October 1976 (age 49); Siliguri, West Bengal, India
- Education: University of North Bengal; Cochin University of Science and Technology; Carleton University; Wageningen University
- Known for: Metal Speciation and Environmental Geochemistry
- Awards: 2013 MoM National Geoscience Award; 2015 IGU M. S. Krishnan Medal; 2018 Shanti Swarup Bhatnagar Prize
- Scientific career
- Fields: Environmental chemistry
- Workplaces: Indian Institute of Technology Kharagpur; National Institute of Oceanography

Parthasarathi Chakraborty is an Indian environmental geochemist, a former senior scientist at the CSIR-National Institute of Oceanography and an associate professor at the Indian Institute of Technology Kharagpur, India. Chakraborty is known for his studies in the field of Environmental Chemistry. He made contributions to the field of Environmental Geochemistry, which has facilitated our understanding of metal-natural ligand interactions in natural and marine environments. He is a recipient of the National Geoscience Award-2015 and an elected fellow of the Indian Geophysical Union. The Council of Scientific and Industrial Research, the apex agency of the Government of India for scientific research, awarded him the Shanti Swarup Bhatnagar Prize for Science and Technology, one of the highest Indian science awards, for his contributions to Earth, Atmosphere, Ocean and Planetary Sciences in 2018. (Note: Long link - please select award year to see details)

== Biography ==
Parthasarathi Chakraborty, born on 24 October 1976 in Siliguri, West Bengal India, graduated in chemistry with honors from the University of North Bengal in 1998 and continued at the institution to earn a master's degree in inorganic chemistry in 2000. Subsequently, he secured an M-Tech in industrial catalysis from Cochin University of Science and Technology in 2002 and moved to Canada for doctoral studies, earning a PhD in Chemistry (specialisation in analytical environmental chemistry) from Carleton University in 2007. He did his post-doctoral work at the Institute of Physical Chemistry and Colloid Science of Wageningen University for one year. He returned to India in 2008 to join the National Institute of Oceanography. After working in the National Institute of Oceanography for 10 years, Chakraborty moved and started working in Indian Institute of Technology, Kharagpur.

== Research and contributions ==
The major contributions made by Chakraborty in the field of Environmental Geochemistry (particularly in the field of trace and toxic metal speciation in marine systems) are described below:

Since the marine systems are dynamic in nature and never at chemical equilibrium, He realized that a chemical-equilibrium-based approach to metal speciation would give wrong estimates of labile metal concentrations (which are widely correlated with ecotoxicity) in marine sediments. He improved kinetics-based approaches to understand metals speciation and their bioavailability in estuarine/coastal and deep sea systems. His research focuses on developing and applying a wide range of kinetic methods for chemical speciation in marine/estuarine sediment systems, each with its own characteristic timescale of measurement. An important achievement of his research is to advance the science of metal speciation by identifying the analytical timescale of measurement as the critical parameter for defining the chemical species in the coastal and marine sediment system. The ability of the speciation techniques (multi-method approach) to provide a chemically significant description of the kinetics of metal-natural ligands interaction in sediment suggests that the metal and ligand exchange reactions precede mainly by the disjunctive mechanism (complete dissociation of ML), a fundamental process in coastal marine systems. He showed that kinetics-based approach provides the actual metal speciation instead of the current practice of chemical equilibrium speciation. This kinetic based is expected to promote wider acceptance of the approach by regulatory agencies.

He has demonstrated the effects of Ligand Field Stabilization Energy, water exchange rate, Jahn Teller distortion of transition metals on their speciation and bioavailability in estuarine and coastal sediments. This is the first time that these effects have been described in sediments. This research is directly relevant for researchers in geochemistry as it will help provide a better understanding of metal–natural ligand interactions in marine environments.

By realising the global catastrophic risk in the near future, many developing countries have already signed the treaty to reduce Hg use and its release to control environmental Hg pollution. However, how to reduce the impact of climate change on Hg pollution is not truly known. Climate change is anticipated to increase Earth's average temperature and influence overall patterns and amounts of precipitation. Climate change has been proclaimed to increase Hg pollution even if anthropogenic Hg emission remains constant. Therefore, increasing anthropogenic Hg release with climate change is expected to intensify the detrimental effects of Hg in the developing countries. He took the challenge to understand Hg-natural ligands interaction with an aim to reduce Hg pollution in marine systems. He showed that sedimentary Hg concentrations around India are low and not alarming. He identified that sedimentary organic matter can be an important factor in controlling Hg distribution and its bioavailability in coastal marine systems.

The outcomes of his research have enormously contributed to the field of environmental geochemistry and oceanic biogeochemistry. Two of his research articles are the most cited articles in "Marine Chemistry" and "Chemical Geology" journals (the two most respected international journals in Chemical and geological oceanography) since 2012, (extracted from Scopus).

Chakraborty has published a number of articles, (Note: Please see Selected bibliography section) ResearchGate, an online repository of scientific articles, has listed 57 of them. He is a former associate member of the Working Group 139 (Organic Ligands – A Key Control on Trace Metal Biogeochemistry in the Ocean) and works as an associate member of SCOR-145 (Chemical Speciation Modelling in Seawater to Meet 21st Century Needs). He is associated with several scientific Societies and is as an associate editor of the Elsevier journal, Marine Pollution Bulletin.

== Awards and honors ==
Chakraborty was selected for the National Geoscience Award-2013 of the Ministry of Mines in 2015. He received the M. S. Krishnan Medal of the Indian Geophysical Union in 2015. Chakraborty was bestowed with the IAGC Kharaka Award (USA) in 2017. He also received ISAG Medal-2017 for his contribution in Environmental Geochemistry. The Council of Scientific and Industrial Research awarded him the Shanti Swarup Bhatnagar Prize, one of the highest Indian science awards in 2018.

== Selected bibliography ==
- Chakraborty, P., Babu, P.R. and Sarma, V.V., 2012. A study of lead and cadmium speciation in some estuarine and coastal sediments. Chemical Geology, 294, pp. 217–225.
- Chakraborty, P., Sarkar, A., Vudamala, K., Naik, R. and Nath, B.N., 2015. Organic matter—a key factor in controlling mercury distribution in estuarine sediment. Marine Chemistry, 173, pp. 302–309.
- Chakraborty, P., Ramteke, D., Chakraborty, S. and Nath, B.N., 2014. Changes in metal contamination levels in estuarine sediments around India–an assessment. Marine pollution bulletin, 78(1-2), pp. 15–25.
- Chakraborty, P., Babu, P.R., Vudamala, K., Ramteke, D. and Chennuri, K., 2014. Mercury speciation in coastal sediments from the central east coast of India by modified BCR method. Marine pollution bulletin, 81(1), pp. 282–288.
- Chakraborty, P., Chakraborty, S., Jayachandran, S., Madan, R., Sarkar, A., Linsy, P. and Nath, B.N., 2016. Effects of bottom water dissolved oxygen variability on copper and lead fractionation in the sediments across the oxygen minimum zone, western continental margin of India. Science of the Total Environment, 566, pp. 1052–1061.
- Chakraborty, P., 2017. Mercury exposure and Alzheimer's disease in India - An imminent threat?. Science of the Total Environment, 589, pp. 232–235.
- Chakraborty, Parthasarathi; Raghunadh Babu, P.V.; Acharyya, Tamoghna; Bandyopadhyay, Debasmita (1 July 2010). "Stress and toxicity of biologically important transition metals (Co, Ni, Cu and Zn) on phytoplankton in a tropical freshwater system: An investigation with pigment analysis by HPLC". Chemosphere. 80 (5): 548–553. Bibcode:2010Chmsp..80..548C. doi:10.1016/j.chemosphere.2010.04.039. ISSN 0045-6535. PMID 20493512.
- Chakrabarti, Chuni L.; Murimboh, John; Fasfous, Ismail I.; Chakraborty, Parthasarathi (1 May 2007). "Simultaneous determination of speciation parameters of Cu, Pb, Cd and Zn in model solutions of Suwannee River fulvic acid by pseudopolarography". Analytical and Bioanalytical Chemistry. 388 (2): 463–474. doi:10.1007/s00216-007-1185-3. ISSN 1618-2650. PMID 17333145. S2CID 34187569.
- Chakraborty, P., 2010. Study of cadmium–humic interactions and determination of stability constants of cadmium–humate complexes from their diffusion coefficients obtained by scanned stripping voltammetry and dynamic light scattering techniques. Analytica chimica acta, 659(1-2), pp. 137–143.
- Chakraborty, Parthasarathi; Ramteke, Darwin; Chakraborty, Sucharita (15 April 2015). "Geochemical partitioning of Cu and Ni in mangrove sediments: Relationships with their bioavailability". Marine Pollution Bulletin. 93 (1–2): 194–201. Bibcode:2015MarPB..93..194C. doi:10.1016/j.marpolbul.2015.01.016. ISSN 0025-326X. PMID 25748786.

== See also ==
- Biogeochemistry
- Ligand (biochemistry)
