= Von Kármán constant =

Constant in fluid dynamics

In fluid dynamics, the von Kármán constant (or Kármán's constant), named for Theodore von Kármán, is a dimensionless constant involved in the logarithmic law describing the distribution of the longitudinal velocity in the wall-normal direction of a turbulent fluid flow near a boundary with a no-slip condition. The equation for such boundary layer flow profiles is:

$$u=\frac{u_{\star}}{\kappa}\ln\frac{z}{z_0},$$

where u is the mean flow velocity at height z above the boundary. The roughness height (also known as roughness length) z_{0} is where $u$ appears to go to zero. Further κ is the von Kármán constant being typically 0.41, and $u_\star$ is the friction velocity which depends on the shear stress τ_{w} at the boundary of the flow:

$$u_\star = \sqrt{\frac{\tau_w}{\rho}},$$

with ρ the fluid density.

The Kármán constant is often used in turbulence modeling, for instance in boundary-layer meteorology to calculate fluxes of momentum, heat and moisture from the atmosphere to the land surface. It is considered to be a universal (κ ≈ 0.40).

Gaudio, Miglio and Dey argued that the Kármán constant is however nonuniversal in flows over mobile sediment beds.

In recent years the von Kármán constant has been subject to periodic scrutiny. Reviews (Foken, 2006; Hogstrom, 1988; Hogstrom, 1996) report values of κ between 0.35 and 0.42. The overall conclusion of over 18 studies is that κ is constant, close to 0.40. For incompressible and frictionless ("ideal") fluids, Baumert (2013) used Kolmogorov's classical ideas on turbulence to derive ideal values of a number of relevant constants of turbulent motions, among them von Kármán's constant as $\kappa = 1/\sqrt{2\pi} \approx 0.399$.

== See also ==
- Law of the wall
- Log wind profile
