= Balurghat High School =

Coordinates: 25.2267783°N 88.7769549°E

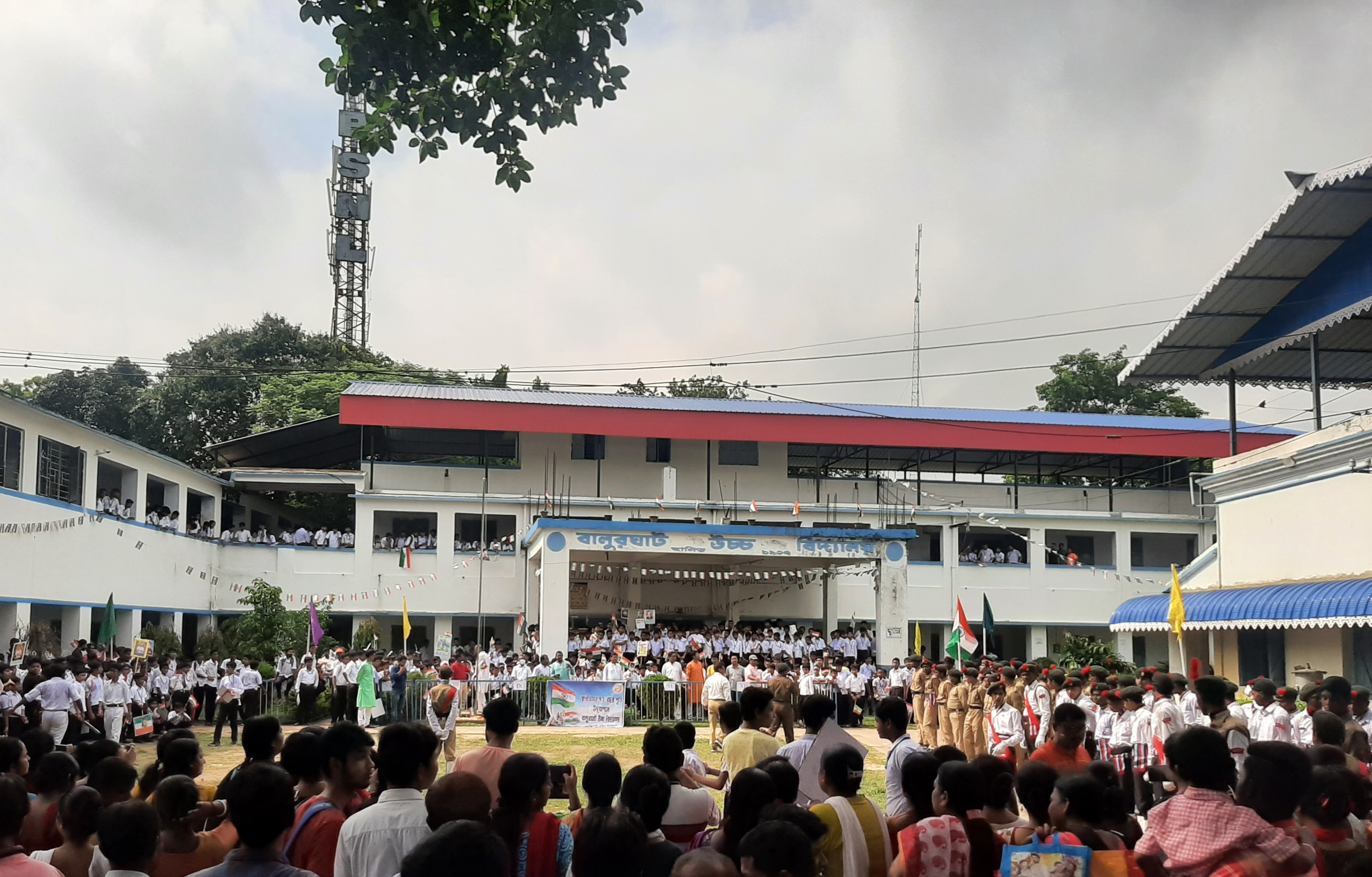
- 76th Independence Day Celebration in BHS

Location
- Near the Office of the CMOH, Zilla Swasthya Bhavan; Balurghat, West Bengal, 733101; India

Information
- Other names: High School; BHS
- Former name: Balurghat Free Primary English School (1878-1896); Balurghat Middle English School (1896-1907)
- Type: Public high school
- Motto: Bengali: শ্রদ্ধাবান লভতে জ্ঞানাম transl. (Respectfully Seek Knowledge)
- Established: 1877 (149 years ago): Balurghat High School 15 March 1907 (119 years ago)
- Founder: Gouri Pal
- Sister school: Balurghat Girls High School
- School board: Currently : WBBSE & WBCHSE; Previously : CU
- School district: Dakshin Dinajpur
- Headmaster: Srijit Saha
- Faculty: 80 (on an FTE basis)
- Gender: Boys & Girls
- Age range: 6-18
- Enrollment: 2,400 (Approx)
- Classes: I to XII
- Student to teacher ratio: 30
- Language: Bengali & English
- Area: 8.18 acres (33,100 m^{2})
- Campus type: Urban
- Houses: Netaji; Gandhiji; Swamiji; Rabindranath
- Colors: White and Black.
- Song: Indian National Anthem (2007-Present) (India); Vande Mataram (1957-2007) (India); Sare Jahan se Accha (1947-1957) (India); Shubh Sukh Chain (1945-1947) (Azad Hind); Qadam Qadam Badhaye Ja (During WW2) (Azad Hind) (NCC anthem since 2007); O Amar Desher Mati (During Independence Movement) (British Raj); God Save the Queen (During Establishment) (United Kingdom)
- Nickname: BHSians
- Rival: Balurghat L.M.A.U Vidyalaya, Atreyee DAV Public School
- Yearbook: লেখা (Writing)
- Website: Official Website of BHS

Balurghat High School is a higher secondary school for boys & for girls (for class 11 & 12 only) situated at the Ward no. 11 of Balurghat Municipality in Dakshin Dinajpur of West Bengal. Balurghat High School was established in 1907 and it is one of the oldest schools in India.

== History ==
During the British Raj, the zamindar of Shankarpur, shri Gouri Pal had founded the "গৌরী পালের পাঠশালা" (The School of Gouri Pal) at the Pal-Bari Durga Mandir in 1877. Later, due to increase in the interest in education and the spread of English language in India, he shifted the campus to today's location and named it Balurghat Free Primary English School. After that, due to increase of population and demand in education the name was changed to Balurghat Middle English School. In 1903, the campus was completely destroyed for a mysterious fire. Later the school again re established by the help of Shri Gouri Pal on 15 March 1907. From that day, it is known as Balurghat High School. The first headmaster of the school was Shri Rameshwar Chakraborty.

The school was affiliated with the University of Calcutta in 1910 along with the Raiganj Coronation High School in Raiganj. At that time this district and Uttar Dinajpur was united and known as West Dinajpur district. After Independence of India in 1947 the town and the district was in consideration that which side that is India and Pakistan would choose. On the 14th August, the Pakistan Army & leaders of the Muslim league raised the Pakistani flag on the premises of the school, further exacerbating tensions. The Indian Army & Gorkha regiments (India)’s attempt to seize control of Balurghat High School was met with stiff resistance from the Baloch Regiment, resulting in violent clashes. Similar skirmishes erupted in Hili, Dakshin Dinajpur. Despite the presence of Pakistani troops patrolling the streets, local freedom fighters mounted a formidable resistance.

The pivotal moment arrived on the morning of the 18 August, when the Down North Bengal Express delivered Indian National Congress leaders Saroj Ranjan Chattopadhyay, Maharaj Bose, Shailen Das, and others to Balurghat. They brought with them the news that Balurghat had been officially incorporated into India, and on that day, the Indian flag was raised at the administrative building and the school premises with singing the Indian National Anthem. Later that day, a grand rally was held, with crowds gathering at the Balurghat High School grounds to celebrate this historic moment. To this day, the citizens of Balurghat proudly commemorate the 18 August, assembling at the High School grounds to honour the town's remarkable and hard-won journey to freedom.

== Curriculum ==
The school has an autonomous primary school which administered the class 1–4. The High School part consist of classes 5–12 which is affiliated to WBBSE & WBCHSE. The fundamental curriculum is same up to class 10. After the Madhyamik Examination, students are got selected upon merit based score of their Madhyamik result into three different streams i.e. Science, Arts and Commerce. From 2024 onwards, due to emergence of new AI technologies, courses like Data Science and Artificial Intelligence have been started to teach to educate and promote awareness of the use of AI and Machine Learning.

== Campus ==
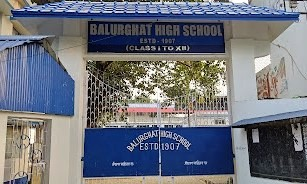
Main Gate of BHS

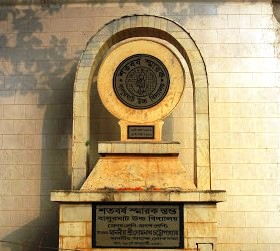
100th Anniversary Monument of BHS

The school consist of a three blocks: primary, secondary, and higher secondary. Each block have their own playground. The school have her separate 2 playgrounds in the town and both are used for the school's educational program and Public activity purposes. The Higher Secondary block have their own laboratories for physics, chemistry, biology, computer science and geography. The school library consist of 5000 volumes of books which is open to all class students and staffs for reading and research purposes. Upon the mandatory order of the Government of West Bengal, the school also provide healthy Mid-day Meal for the students and staffs since 2011. From 2023 onwards, the school became semi-co-educational school as the school authority is now accepting Girls students from class 11 for the Higher Secondary Examination only. This actually lead the environment of the school to modernization.

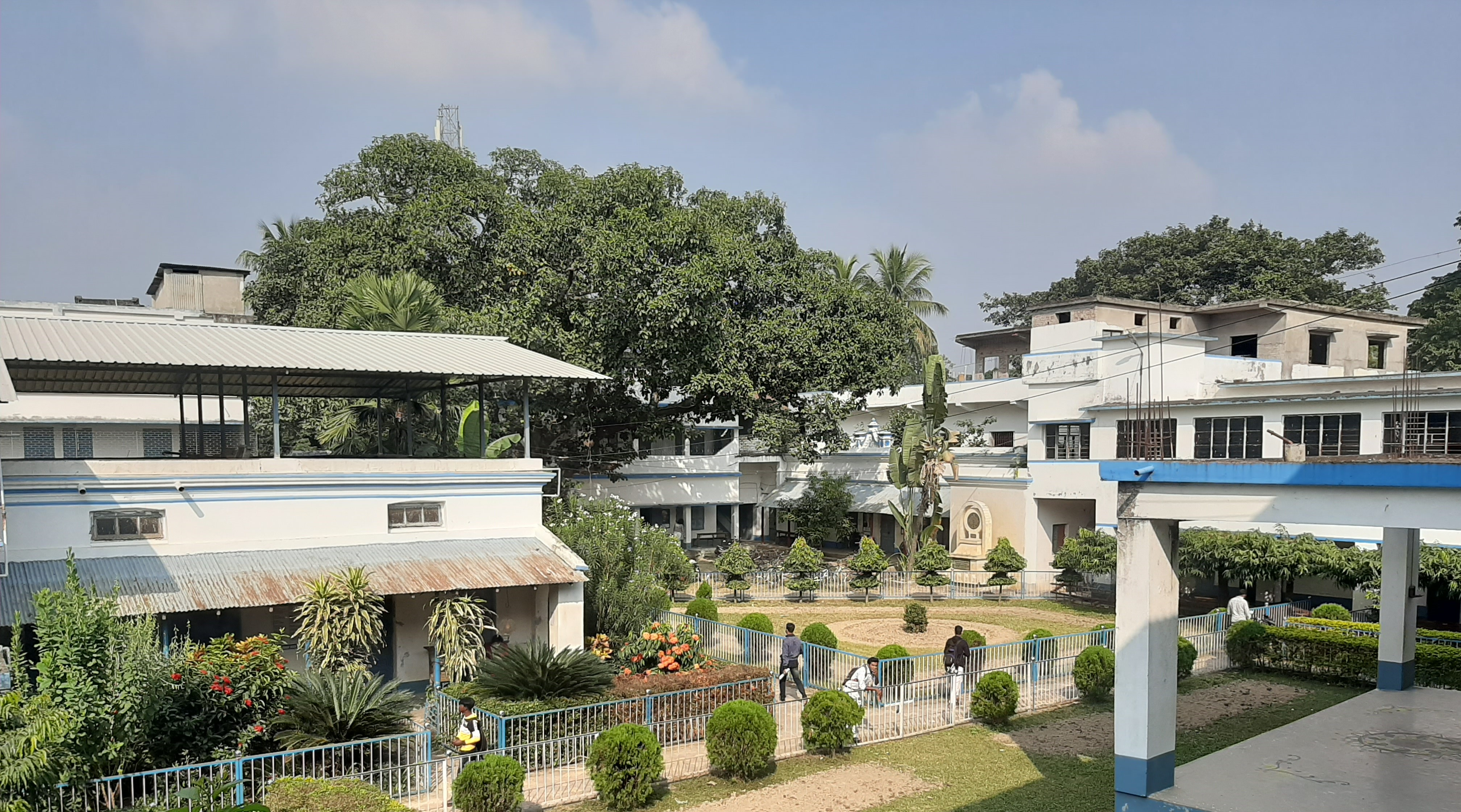
BHS Campus View 1

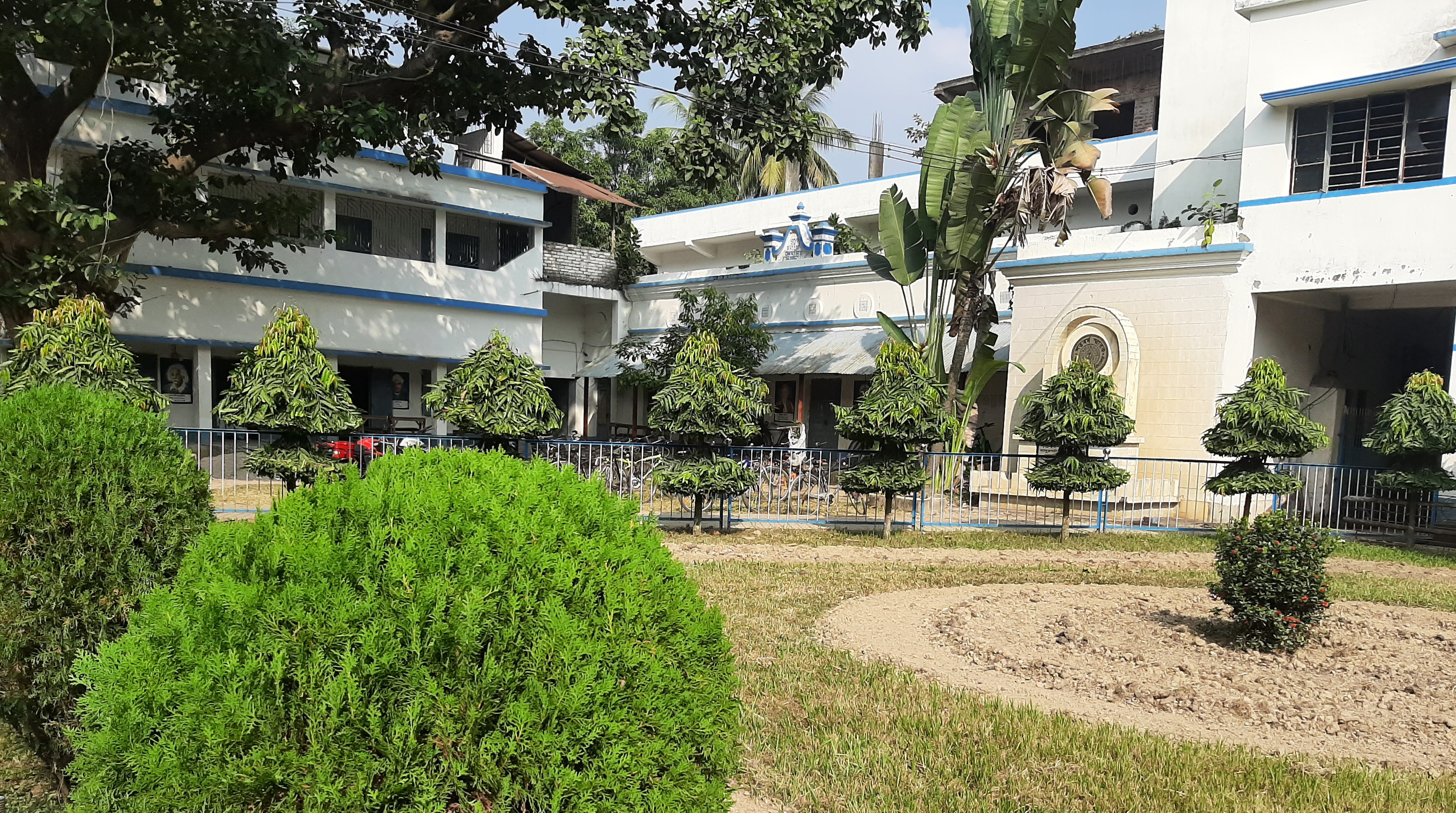
BHS Campus View 2

== National Cadet Corps ==
The school has a NCC unit. Every year during republic day, the school participate in the annual parade in Balurghat Stadium along with WBP, Balurghat College and other school's in the town. Also the marching day happens every year on the day of independence. Thousands of crowd gather around to watch the state of the art march on very day.

== Extra curricular activities ==
Every year, the school host an annual sport event. The teachers also encourage the students to participate in various sports activities like cricket, football, badminton, athletics, and others. Every year, on the day of Teacher's Day, a special football match is hosted between the teachers and the students. Another very special football match is hosted every year between the two schools of the town which is Balurghat High School and her rival counterpart i.e. Balurghat Lalit Mohan Adarsha Uchchya Vidyalaya. Also the students take deep interest in Dancing, Singing, Painting and other various activities for maintaining a healthy mind along with heavy studies.

== Notable alumni ==
- Susil Ranjan Chattopadhyay, former MP
- Sankar Chakraborty, former MLA
- Sanjay Hansda, Executive Director of the Reserve Bank of India
- Abhijit Mondal, Footballer.
