= Danguajhar =

Danguajhar or Denguajhar is a suburb of the city of Jalpaiguri located in Jalpaiguri district, West Bengal, India. The University of North Bengal has its second campus here.
