= Law of the wall =

Relation of flow speed to wall distance

law of the wall, horizontal velocity near the wall with mixing length model

In fluid dynamics, the law of the wall (also known as the logarithmic law of the wall) states that the average velocity of a turbulent flow at a certain point is proportional to the logarithm of the distance from that point to the "wall", or the boundary of the fluid region. This law of the wall was first published in 1930 by Hungarian-American mathematician, aerospace engineer, and physicist Theodore von Kármán. It is only technically applicable to parts of the flow that are close to the wall (<20% of the height of the flow), though it is a good approximation for the entire velocity profile of natural streams.

== General logarithmic formulation ==
The logarithmic law of the wall is a self similar solution for the mean velocity parallel to the wall, and is valid for flows at high Reynolds numbers — in an overlap region with approximately constant shear stress and far enough from the wall for (direct) viscous effects to be negligible:

$u^+ = \frac{1}{\kappa} \ln\, y^+ + C^+,$ with $y^+ = \frac{y\, u_\tau}{\nu},$ $u_\tau=\sqrt{\frac{\tau_w}{\rho}}$ and $u^+ = \frac{u}{u_\tau}$

where

$y^+$	is the wall coordinate: the distance y to the wall, made dimensionless with the friction velocity u_{τ} and kinematic viscosity ν,
$u^+$	is the dimensionless velocity: the velocity u parallel to the wall as a function of y (distance from the wall), divided by the friction velocity u_{τ},
$\tau_w$	is the wall shear stress,
$\rho$	is the fluid density,
$u_\tau$	is called the friction velocity or shear velocity,
$\kappa$	is the Von Kármán constant,
$C^+$	is a constant, and
$\ln$	is the natural logarithm.

From experiments, the von Kármán constant is found to be $\kappa\approx0.41$ and $C^+\approx5.0$ for a smooth wall.

With dimensions, the logarithmic law of the wall can be written as:

$${u} = \frac{u_\tau}{\kappa} \ln\, \frac{y}{y_0}\$$

where y_{0} is the distance from the boundary at which the idealized velocity given by the law of the wall goes to zero. This is necessarily nonzero because the turbulent velocity profile defined by the law of the wall does not apply to the laminar sublayer. The distance from the wall at which it reaches zero is determined by comparing the thickness of the laminar sublayer with the roughness of the surface over which it is flowing. For a near-wall laminar sublayer of thickness $\delta_\nu$ and a characteristic roughness length-scale $k_s$,

$k_s < \delta_\nu\,$	: hydraulically smooth flow,
$k_s \approx \delta_\nu\,$	: transitional flow,
$k_s > \delta_\nu\,$	: hydraulically rough flow.

Intuitively, this means that if the roughness elements are hidden within the laminar sublayer, they have a much different effect on the turbulent law of the wall velocity profile than if they are sticking out into the main part of the flow.

This is also often more formally formulated in terms of a boundary Reynolds number, $Re_w$, where

$$Re_w=\frac{u_\tau k_s}{\nu}.\$$

The flow is hydraulically smooth for $Re_w<3$, hydraulically rough for $Re_w>100$, and transitional for intermediate values.

Values for $y_0$ are given by:

$y_0=\frac{\nu}{9 u_\tau}$	for hydraulically smooth flow
$y_0=\frac{k_s}{30}$	for hydraulically rough flow.

Intermediate values are generally given by the empirically derived Nikuradse diagram, though analytical methods for solving for this range have also been proposed.

For channels with a granular boundary, such as natural river systems,

$$k_s \approx 3.5 D_{84},\$$

where $D_{84}$ is the average diameter of the 84th largest percentile of the grains of the bed material.

== Power law solutions ==
Works by Barenblatt and others have shown that besides the logarithmic law of the wall — the limit for infinite Reynolds numbers — there exist power-law solutions, which are dependent on the Reynolds number. In 1996, Cipra submitted experimental evidence in support of these power-law descriptions. This evidence itself has not been fully accepted by other experts. In 2001, Oberlack claimed to have derived both the logarithmic law of the wall, as well as power laws, directly from the Reynolds-averaged Navier–Stokes equations, exploiting the symmetries in a Lie group approach. However, in 2014, Frewer et al. refuted these results.

== For scalars ==
For scalars (most notably temperature), the self-similar logarithmic law of the wall has been theorized (first formulated by B. A. Kader) and observed in experimental and computational studies. In many cases, extensions to the original law of the wall formulation (usually through integral transformations) are generally needed to account for compressibility, variable-property and real fluid effects.

== Near the wall ==
Below the region where the law of the wall is applicable, there are other estimations for friction velocity.

=== Viscous sublayer ===
In the region known as the viscous sublayer, below 5 wall units, the variation of $u^+$ to $y^+$ is approximately 1:1, such that:

For $y^+<5$
$$u^+ = y^+$$

where,

$y^+$	is the wall coordinate: the distance y to the wall, made dimensionless with the friction velocity $u_\tau$ and kinematic viscosity $\nu$,
$u^+$	is the dimensionless velocity: the velocity u parallel to the wall as a function of y (distance from the wall), divided by the friction velocity $u_\tau$,

This approximation can be used farther than 5 wall units, but by $y^+=12$ the error is more than 25%.

=== Buffer layer ===
In the buffer layer, between 5 wall units and 30 wall units, neither law holds, such that:

For $5<y^+<30$
$$u^+ \neq y^+$$
$$u^+ \neq \frac{1}{\kappa} \ln\, y^+ + C^+$$

with the largest variation from either law occurring approximately where the two equations intersect, at $y^+=11$. That is, before 11 wall units the linear approximation is more accurate and after 11 wall units the logarithmic approximation should be used, though neither are relatively accurate at 11 wall units.

The mean streamwise velocity profile $u^+$ is improved for $y^+<20$ with an eddy viscosity formulation based on a near-wall turbulent kinetic energy $\kappa ^+$ function and the van Driest mixing length equation. Comparisons with DNS data of fully developed turbulent channel flows for $109<Re_\tau<2003$ showed good agreement.
