= Shear velocity =

Form of shear stress

Shear velocity, also called friction velocity, is a form by which a shear stress may be re-written in units of velocity. It is useful as a method in fluid mechanics to compare true velocities, such as the velocity of a flow in a stream, to a velocity that relates shear between layers of flow.

Shear velocity is used to describe shear-related motion in moving fluids. It is used to describe:

- Diffusion and dispersion of particles, tracers, and contaminants in fluid flows
- The velocity profile near the boundary of a flow (see Law of the wall)
- Transport of sediment in a channel

Shear velocity also helps in thinking about the rate of shear and dispersion in a flow. Shear velocity scales well to rates of dispersion and bedload sediment transport. A general rule is that the shear velocity is between 5% and 10% of the mean flow velocity.

For river base case, the shear velocity can be calculated by Manning's equation.

$$u^*=\langle u\rangle\frac{n}{a}(gR_h^{-1/3})^{0.5}$$

- n is the Gauckler–Manning coefficient. Units for values of n are often left off, however it is not dimensionless, having units of: (T/[L^{1/3}]; s/[ft^{1/3}]; s/[m^{1/3}]).
- R_{h} is the hydraulic radius (L; ft, m);
- the role of a is a dimension correction factor. Thus a= 1 m^{1/3}/s = 1.49 ft^{1/3}/s.

Instead of finding $n$ and $R_h$ for the specific river of interest, the range of possible values can be examined; for most rivers, $u^*$ is between 5% and 10% of $\langle u\rangle$:

For general case

$$u_{\star}=\sqrt{\frac{\tau}{\rho}}$$

where τ is the shear stress in an arbitrary layer of fluid and ρ is the density of the fluid.

Typically, for sediment transport applications, the shear velocity is evaluated at the lower boundary of an open channel:

$$u_{\star}=\sqrt{\frac{\tau_b}{\rho}}$$

where τ_{b} is the shear stress given at the boundary.

Shear velocity is linked to the Darcy friction factor by equating wall shear stress, giving:

$$u_{\star}={\langle u \rangle}\sqrt{\frac{f_\mathrm{D}}{8}}$$

where f_{D} is the friction factor.

Shear velocity can also be defined in terms of the local velocity and shear stress fields (as opposed to whole-channel values, as given above).

== Friction velocity in turbulence ==
The friction velocity is often used as a scaling parameter for the fluctuating component of velocity in turbulent flows. One method of obtaining the shear velocity is through non-dimensionalization of the turbulent equations of motion. For example, in a fully developed turbulent channel flow or turbulent boundary layer, the streamwise momentum equation in the very near wall region reduces to:

$$0={\nu}{\partial^2 \overline{u}\over \partial y^2}-\frac{\partial}{\partial y}(\overline{u'v'})$$.

By integrating in the y-direction once, then non-dimensionalizing with an unknown velocity scale u_{∗} and viscous length scale ν/u_{∗}, the equation reduces down to:

$$\frac{\tau_w}{\rho} = \nu\frac{\partial u}{\partial y} - \overline{u'v'}$$

or

$$\frac{\tau_w}{\rho u_{\star}^2} = \frac{\partial u^+}{\partial y^+} + \overline{\tau_T^+}$$.

Since the right hand side is in non-dimensional variables, they must be of order 1. This results in the left hand side also being of order one, which in turn give us a velocity scale for the turbulent fluctuations (as seen above):

$$u_{\star} = \sqrt{\frac{\tau_w}{\rho}}$$.

Here, τ_{w} refers to the local shear stress at the wall.

== Planetary boundary layer ==
Within the lowest portion of the planetary boundary layer a semi-empirical log wind profile is commonly used to describe the vertical distribution of horizontal mean wind speeds. The simplified equation that describe it is

$u(z) = \frac{u_*}{\kappa} \left[\ln \left(\frac{z-d}{z_0} \right)\right]$

where $\kappa$ is the Von Kármán constant (~0.41), $d$ is the zero plane displacement (in metres).

The zero-plane displacement ($d$) is the height in meters above the ground at which zero wind speed is achieved as a result of flow obstacles such as trees or buildings. Displacement height or roughness length can be approximated as ^{2}/_{3} to ^{3}/_{4} of the average height of the obstacles. For example, if estimating winds over a forest canopy of height 30 m, the zero-plane displacement could be estimated as d = 20 m.

Thus, you can extract the friction velocity by knowing the wind velocity at two levels (z).

$u_* = \frac{\kappa(u(z2)-u(z1))}{\ln \left(\frac{z2-d}{z1-d} \right)}$

Due to the limitation of observation instruments and the theory of mean values, the levels (z) should be chosen where there is enough difference between the measurement readings. If one has more than two readings, the measurements can be fit to the above equation to determine the shear velocity.

The friction velocity can also be found from measurements obtained with a sonic anemometer, which allows to get rid of the log wind profile. In this case, the friction velocity is given by

${u_*}^2 = - \overline{u'w'}$

where $u$ is the total horizontal wind speed, and $w$ is the vertical wind speed. Note that in planetary boundary layer studies the viscosity of air is not considered for the computation friction velocity since $\nu\frac{\partial u}{\partial y} << - \overline{u'w'}$ at these scales.
