= Subhasish Dey =

Indian hydraulician and educator

Subhasish Dey শুভাশীষ দে
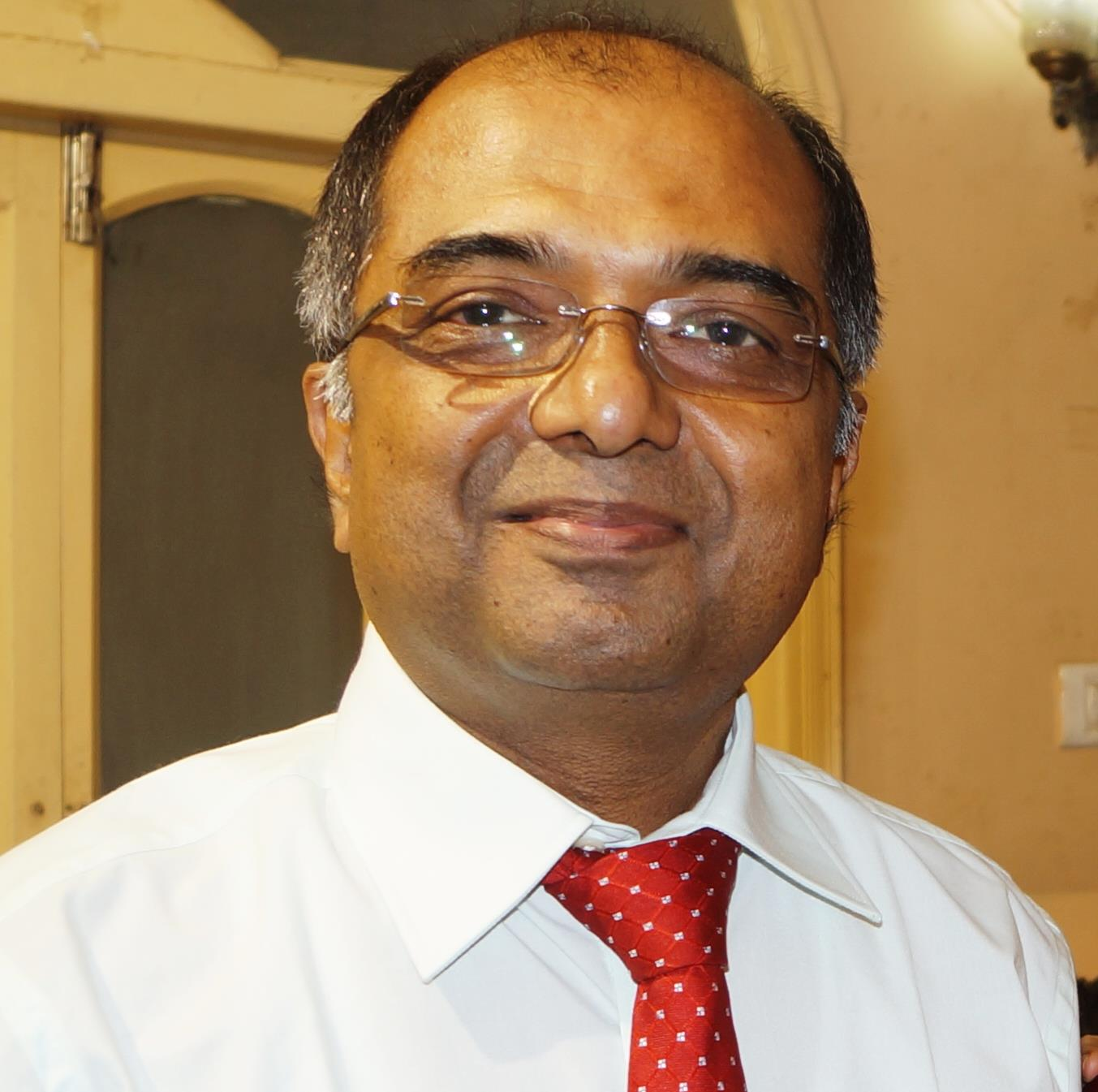
- Born: 1958 (age 67–68); Jalpaiguri, West Bengal, India
- Citizenship: India
- Education: Indian Institute of Technology Kharagpur (PhD 1992, MTech 1984); University of North Bengal (BE 1981)
- Occupations: professor, scientist, engineer, author
- Known for: River hydraulics Sediment threshold
- Awards: Distinguished Alumnus Award of IIT Kharagpur (2026); ASCE Hans Albert Einstein Award (2022); JC Bose Fellowship (2018–26)
- Scientific career
- Fields: Hydrodynamics
- Workplaces: Indian Institute of Technology Gandhinagar (2025–); Indian Institute of Technology Jodhpur (2023–25); Indian Institute of Technology Kharagpur (1998–2023); National Institute of Technology Durgapur (1984–98)

Subhasish Dey FNA, FASc, FNASc, FNAE (Bengali: শুভাশীষ দে; born 1958) is a hydraulician and educator. He is known for his research on the hydrodynamics and acclaimed for his contributions in developing theories and solution methodologies of various problems on applied hydrodynamics, river mechanics, sediment dynamics, turbulence, fluid boundary layer and open channel flow. He is currently a visiting professor of Indian Institute of Technology Gandhinagar (2025–). Before, he worked as a distinguished professor of Indian Institute of Technology Jodhpur (2023–25), and a professor of the department of civil engineering, Indian Institute of Technology Kharagpur (1998–2023), where he served as the head of the department during 2013–15 and held the position of Brahmaputra Chair Professor during 2009–14 and 2015. He also held the adjunct professor position in the Physics and Applied Mathematics Unit at Indian Statistical Institute Kolkata during 2014–19. Besides he has been named a distinguished visiting professor at the Tsinghua University in Beijing, China.

Dey is an associate editor of the Proceedings of the Royal Society of London A: Mathematical, Physical and Engineering Sciences, Journal of Geophysical Research – Earth Surface, Journal of Hydraulic Engineering, Journal of Hydraulic Research, Sedimentology, Acta Geophysica, Journal of Hydro-Environment Research, International Journal of Sediment Research and Environmental Fluid Mechanics.

== Brief biography ==
Dey was born to Bimalendu Dey (father) and Kana Dey (mother) in Jalpaiguri town, West Bengal, India in 1958. In 1987, he married Swastika Dey (née Talukdar); and they have a son, Sibasish, and a daughter, Sagarika.

== Education, career and academic positions ==
Dey received B.E. degree in civil engineering from the University of North Bengal in 1981, MTech degree in water resources engineering and PhD degree in hydraulic engineering from the Indian Institute of Technology Kharagpur in 1984 and 1992, respectively.

Dey started his professional career as a faculty of the National Institute of Technology Durgapur, where he taught fluid mechanics and hydraulics from 1984 to 1998. Then, he joined as a faculty of the Indian Institute of Technology Kharagpur in 1998 and worked until June, 2023. Thereafter, he served as a distinguished professor at the Indian Institute of Technology Jodhpur for two years, until July 2025. Since August 2025, he has been serving as a visiting professor at the Indian Institute of Technology Gandhinagar.

== Honors and awards ==
Dey was honored with the Distinguished Alumnus Award by IIT Kharagpur in 2026.

Dey was conferred with the Hans Albert Einstein Award for "his fundamental contribution to the fluvial sediment transport, turbulence mechanism, local scour, and alluvial river dynamics from the perspectives of research, education and practice" from the ASCE in 2022.

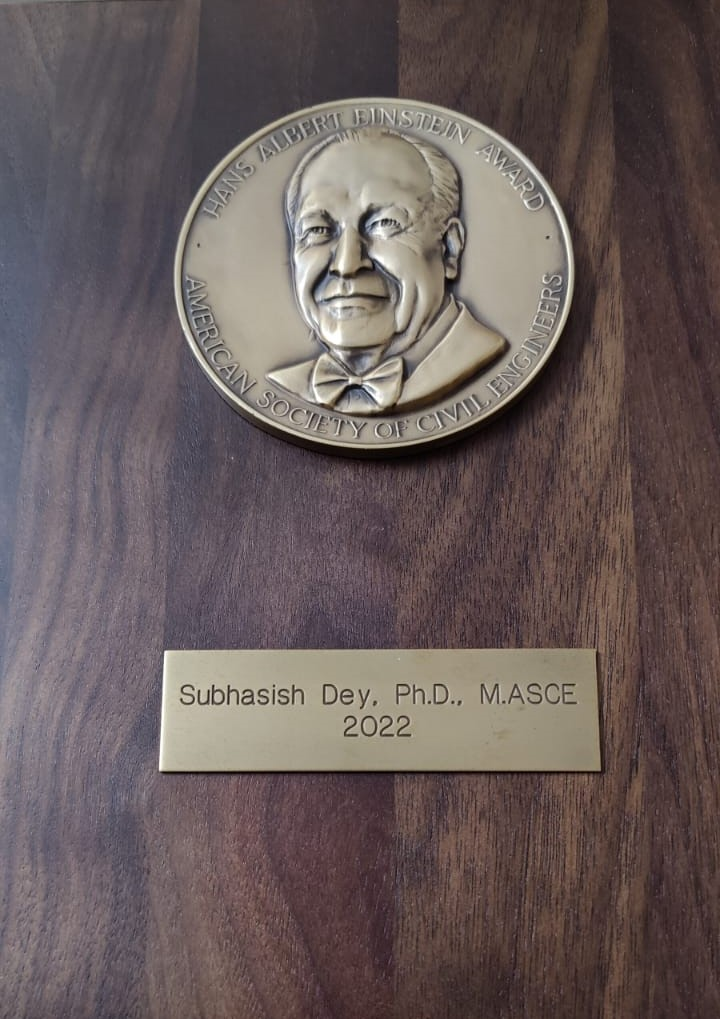
The plaque of the 2022 ASCE Hans Albert Einstein Award with Subhasish Dey's name on it

Dey has received the JC Bose Fellowship award in 2018.

Dey has become a fellow of the Indian National Science Academy (FNA), Indian Academy of Sciences (FASc), National Academy of Sciences, India (FNASc) and Indian National Academy of Engineering (FNAE).

Dey is the vice president of the council of World Association for Sedimentation and Erosion Research (WASER) (2019–25). He served as a Council Member of the World Association for Sedimentation and Erosion Research (WASER) (2011–13) and the International Association for Hydro-Environment Engineering and Research (IAHR) (2015–19). He was also a Member of the IAHR Fluvial Hydraulics Committee (2017–21).

== Research contributions and impact ==
In hydrodynamics, Dey has been involved in developing various theories. His mixing-instability hypothesis reveals the unprecedented universal scaling behavior for the fluid turbulence, offering a new physics of fluid momentum exchange. It is deemed to be a possible replacement of long-standing Prandtl's mixing length model. Besides, he has developed the universal skin friction laws for turbulent flow in curved tubes, a universal two-fifths law of pier scour, a universal law of skin-friction coefficient in an axisymmetric turbulent boundary layer, and the origin of the scaling laws of developing turbulent boundary layer. Furthermore, he has discovered the zeroth law of helicity spectrum in the inertial sub-range of wall turbulence.

In fluvial hydraulics, Dey has contributed with the mechanistic analyses of sediment transport based on the deterministic and stochastic approaches, universal probability density function for turbulence, turbidity currents, and instability theories of meandering rivers and bedforms. Also, he has discovered the origin of the scaling laws of sediment transport and has established a law governing the onset of meandering of a straight river. Besides, he has unveiled the complex turbulence mechanisms in mobile-bed flows, water-worked bed flows, wall-wake flows, and flows over fluvial bedforms, offering a new look on fluid–sediment interaction. In addition, he has contributed to fundamental theories of sediment thresholds (also known as initiation of motion) and has discovered the existence of negative hydrodynamic lift and non-universality of von Kármán constant. On top, he has made pioneering contributions to the mechanism of scour at hydraulic structures, giving a kinematic theory of horseshoe vortex. Stemming from the Kolmogorov energy cascade concept, he has proved that the equilibrium pier-scour depth to pier width ratio obeys the two-fifths scaling law with the Dey–Ali number or pier-scour number. This relation is known as Dey–Ali's two-fifths law of pier scour.

In advanced education, Dey's book Fluvial Hydrodynamics: Hydrodynamic and Sediment Transport Phenomena (first edition 2014, second edition 2024) is an important source for the students, scholars, and engineers. In this book, he has explained the sediment dynamics phenomena from the viewpoint of core fluid mechanics.

== Selected publications ==
=== Books ===
- S. Dey (2024). Fluvial Hydrodynamics: Hydrodynamic and Sediment Transport Phenomena. Second Edition, GeoPlanet: Earth and Planetary Sciences. Springer. 2024. ISBN 978-3-031-26038-4.
- S. Dey and S. Z. Ali (2024). Fluvial Hydrodynamics - Solutions Manual. GeoPlanet: Earth and Planetary Sciences. Springer. 2024. ISBN 978-3-031-25737-7.
- S. Dey (2014). Fluvial Hydrodynamics: Hydrodynamic and Sediment Transport Phenomena. First Edition, GeoPlanet: Earth and Planetary Sciences. Springer. 5 September 2014. ISBN 978-3-642-19061-2.

=== Papers ===
- M. Aishwarya, M. S. Afzal, N. Penna, E. Padhi, R. Gaudio and S. Dey (2025). "Hydrodynamics of a rigid submerged vegetated flow". Physics of Fluids, American Institute of Physics, Vol. 37, No. 4, pp. 045151.
- S. Dey and S. Z. Ali (2025). "The universal two-thirds law of pipeline scour". Physics of Fluids, American Institute of Physics, Vol. 37, No. 4, pp. 041401.
- C. Tang, H. Jia, S. Zhang, Y. Yi and S. Dey (2025). "Hydrodynamics of turbulent flow in channels with submerged flexible vegetation canopy". Physics of Fluids, American Institute of Physics, Vol. 37, No. 3, pp. 032123.
- R. Mahato, S. Z. Ali, S. Dey, F. N. Cantero-Chinchilla, O. Castro-Orgaz and L. Solari (2025). "Formation of alternate river bars in submerged vegetated flows". Proceedings of the Royal Society A, London, UK, Vol. 482, No. March, pp. 20240271.
- S. Dey and S. Z. Ali (2025). "Scaling laws of turbulent wall-jet scour: Planar and circular wall jets". Physics of Fluids, American Institute of Physics, Vol. 37, No. 2, pp. 021401.
- O. Link and S. Dey (2025). "Santa María and the first bridge scour formulas". Journal of Hydraulic Engineering, American Society of Civil Engineers (ASCE), Vol. 151, No. 1, pp. 02524004.
- F. N. Cantero-Chinchilla, O. Castro-Orgaz, S. Z. Ali and Dey S (2024). "Shallow water hydrodynamics: surge propagation and sill-controlled flows". Physics of Fluids, American Institute of Physics, Vol. 36, No. 12, pp. 125171.
- S. Dey and S. Z. Ali (2024). "Turbulent friction in canonical flows: State of the science and its future outlook". Journal of Hydraulic Engineering, American Society of Civil Engineers (ASCE), Vol. 150, No, 6, pp. 04024044.
- S. Z. Ali and S. Dey (2024). "Universal skin friction laws for turbulent flow in curved tubes". Physics of Fluids, American Institute of Physics, Vol. 36, No. 8, pp. 081401.
- S. Z. Ali and S. Dey (2024). "Generalized scaling law of equilibrium scour depth at a cylinder embedded in an erodible bed". Physics of Fluids, American Institute of Physics, Vol. 36, No. 6, pp. 065155.
- S. Dey and S. Z. Ali (2024). "The universal two-fifths law of pier scour". Physics of Fluids, American Institute of Physics, Vol. 36, No. 4, pp. 041401.
- S. Z. Ali and S. Dey (2023). "Universal law of skin-friction coefficient in an axisymmetric turbulent boundary layer flow". Journal of Fluid Mechanics, Cambridge University Press, UK, Vol. 974, No. November, pp. A31.
- R. Mahato, S. Dey and S. Z. Ali (2023). "Hydrodynamics of turbidity currents evolving over a plane bed". Physics of Fluids, American Institute of Physics, Vol. 35, No. 10, pp. 105137
- J. Wang, G. He, L. Huang, S. Dey and H. Fang (2023). "Effects of submerged flexible vegetation on scalar transport in an open-channel flow". Water Resources Research, American Geophysical Union, Vol. 59, NO. 9, e2022WR034235, doi.org/10.1029/2022WR034235
- R. Mahato, S. Z. Ali and S. Dey (2023). "Stability of longitudinal sediment waves formed by turbidity currents: linear and weakly nonlinear perspectives". Proceedings of the Royal Society A, London, UK, Vol. 479, No. September, pp. 20230367.
- J. Fu, G. He, L. Huang, S. Dey and H. Fang (2023). "Swaying motions of submerged flexible vegetation". Journal of Fluid Mechanics, Cambridge University Press, UK, Vol. 971, No. September, pp. A14.
- J. Wang, G. He, S. Dey and H. Fang (2022). "Fluid–structure interaction in a flexible vegetation canopy in an open channel." Journal of Fluid Mechanics, Cambridge University Press, UK, Vol. 951, No. November, pp. A41.
- J. Wang, G. He, S. Dey and H. Fang (2022). "Influence of submerged flexible vegetation on turbulence in an open-channel flow". Journal of Fluid Mechanics, Cambridge University Press, UK, Vol. 947, No. September, pp. A31.
- R. Mahato, S. Dey and S. Z. Ali (2022). "Submarine channels formation driven by turbidity currents interacting with an erodible bed". Proceedings of the Royal Society A, London, UK, Vol. 478, No. July, pp. 20220137.
- S. Z. Ali and S. Dey (2022). "Origin of the scaling laws of developing turbulent boundary layers". Physics of Fluids, American Institute of Physics, Vol. 34, No. 7, pp. 071402.
- S. Z. Ali and S. Dey (2022). "Discovery of the zeroth law of helicity spectrum in the pre-inertial range of wall turbulence". Physics of Fluids, American Institute of Physics, Vol. 34, No. 7, pp. 071401.
- R. Mahato, S. Dey and S. Z. Ali (2022). "Planform evolution of a sinuous channel triggered by curvature and autogenic width oscillations due to generic grain transport". Physics of Fluids, American Institute of Physics, Vol. 34, No. 4, pp. 044110.
- C. Zhao, P. Ouro, T. Stoesser, S. Dey and H. Fang (2022). "Response of flow and saltating particle characteristics to bed roughness and particle spatial density". Water Resources Research, American Geophysical Union, Vol. 58, No. 3, e2021WR030847, doi.org/10.1029/2021WR030847
- S. Dey, V. Rathore, N. Penna and R. Gaudio (2021). "Hydrodynamics of flow over a gradually varied bed roughness". Physics of Fluids, American Institute of Physics, Vol. 33, No. 12, pp. 125112.
- R. Mahato, S. Dey and S. Z. Ali (2021). "Instability of a meandering channel with variable width and curvature: role of sediment suspension". Physics of Fluids, American Institute of Physics, Vol. 33, No. 11, pp. 111401.
- S. Z. Ali SZ and S. Dey (2021). "Linear stability of dunes and antidunes". Physics of Fluids, American Institute of Physics, Vol. 33, No. 9, pp. 094109.
- V. Rathore, S. Dey, N. Penna and R. Gaudio (2021). "Turbulent flow characteristics over an abrupt step change in bed roughness". Physics of Fluids, American Institute of Physics, Vol. 33, No. 9, pp. 095106.
- S. Z. Ali, S. Dey and R. Mahato (2021). "Mega riverbed-patterns: linear and weakly-nonlinear perspectives". Proceedings of the Royal Society A, London, UK, Vol. 477, No. August, pp. 20210331.
- T. Roy Biswas, S. Bagam, S. Dey and D. J. Sen (2021). "Equilibrium approach for modeling erosional failure of granular dams". Physics of Fluids, American Institute of Physics, Vol. 33, No. 4, pp. 043306.
- R. Mahato, S. Z. Ali and S. Dey (2021). "Hydrodynamic instability of free river bars". Physics of Fluids, American Institute of Physics, Vol. 33, No. 4, pp. 045105.
- S. Z. Ali and S. Dey (2021). "Instability of large-scale riverbed patterns". Physics of Fluids, American Institute of Physics, Vol. 33, No. 1, pp. 015109.
- S. Z. Ali and S. Dey (2020). "The law of the wall: A new perspective". Physics of Fluids, American Institute of Physics, Vol. 32, No. 12, pp. 121401.
- S. Dey, P. Paul, S. Z. Ali and E. Padhi (2020). "Reynolds stress anisotropy in flow over two-dimensional rigid dunes". Proceedings of the Royal Society A, London, UK, Vol. 476, No. October, pp. 20200638.
- S. Dey, P. Paul and E. Padhi (2020). "Conditional spatially averaged turbulence and dispersion characteristics in flow over two-dimensional dunes". Physics of Fluids, American Institute of Physics, Vol. 32, No. 6, pp. 065106.
- S. Dey and S. Z. Ali (2020). "Fluvial instabilities". Physics of Fluids, American Institute of Physics, Vol. 32, No. 6, pp. 061301.
- S. Dey, S. Z. Ali and E. Padhi (2020). "Hydrodynamic lift on sediment particles at entrainment: present status and its prospect". Journal of Hydraulic Engineering, American Society of Civil Engineers (ASCE), Vol. 146, No. 6, pp. 03120001.
- N. Penna, E. Padhi, S. Dey and R. Gaudio (2020). "Structure functions and invariants of the anisotropic Reynolds stress tensor in turbulent flows on water-worked gravel beds". Physics of Fluids, American Institute of Physics, Vol. 32, No. 5, pp. 055106.
- S. Dey, P. Paul, H. Fang and E. Padhi (2020). "Hydrodynamics of flow over two-dimensional dunes". Physics of Fluids, American Institute of Physics, Vol. 32, No. 2, pp. 025106.
- E. Padhi, S. Z. Ali and S. Dey (2019). "Mechanics of bed particle saltation in turbulent wall-shear flow". Proceedings of the Royal Society A, London, UK, Vol. 475, No. October, pp. 20190318.
- Dey S, S. Z. Ali and E. Padhi (2019). "Terminal fall velocity: the legacy of Stokes from the perspective of fluvial hydraulics". Proceedings of the Royal Society A, London, UK, Vol. 475, No. August, pp. 20190277.
- S. Dey and S. Z. Ali (2019). "Bed sediment entrainment by streamflow: State of the science". Sedimentology, Wiley, Vol. 66, No. 5, pp. 1449–1485.
- S. Z. Ali and S. Dey (2019). "Hydrodynamics of a weakly curved channel". Physics of Fluids, American Institute of Physics, Vol. 31, No. 5, pp. 055110.
- E. Padhi, N. Penna, S. Dey and R. Gaudio (2019). "Near-bed turbulence structures in water-worked and screeded gravel-bed flows". Physics of Fluids, American Institute of Physics, Vol. 31, No. 4, pp. 045107.
- S. Z. Ali and S. Dey (2019). "Bed particle saltation in turbulent wall-shear flow: a review". Proceedings of the Royal Society A, London, UK, No. 475, No. March, pp. 20180824.
- E. Padhi, N. Penna, S. Dey and R. Gaudio (2018). "Spatially-averaged dissipation rate in flows over water-worked and screeded gravel beds". Physics of Fluids, American Institute of Physics (AIP), Vol. 30, No. 12, pp. 125106.
- E. Padhi, N. Penna, S. Dey and R. Gaudio (2018). "Hydrodynamics of water-worked and screeded gravel beds: A comparative study". Physics of Fluids, American Institute of Physics (AIP), Vol. 30, No. 8, pp. 085105.
- H. Fang, X. Han, G. He and S. Dey (2018). "Influence of permeable beds on hydraulically macro-rough flow". Journal of Fluid Mechanics, Cambridge University Press, UK, Vol. 847, No. July, pp. 552–590.
- S. Dey and S. Z. Ali (2018). "Review Article: Advances in modeling of bed particle entrainment sheared by turbulent flow". Physics of Fluids, American Institute of Physics, Vol. 30, No. 6, pp. 061301.
- S. Z. Ali and S. Dey (2018). "Impact of phenomenological theory of turbulence on pragmatic approach to fluvial hydraulics". Physics of Fluids, American Institute of Physics, Vol. 30, No. 4, pp. 045105.
- S. Z. Ali and S. Dey (2017). "Hydrodynamic instability of a meandering channel". Physics of Fluids, American Institute of Physics, Vol. 29, No. 12, pp. 125107.
- S. Dey and S. Z. Ali (2017). "Origin of the onset of meandering a straight river". Proceedings of the Royal Society A, London, UK, Vol. 473, No. August, pp. 20170376.
- S. Dey, G. Ravi Kishore, O. Castro-Orgaz and S. Z. Ali (2017). "Hydrodynamics of submerged turbulent plane offset jets". Physics of Fluids, American Institute of Physics, Vol. 29, No. 6, pp. 065112.
- S. Dey and S. Z. Ali (2017). "Stochastic mechanics of loose boundary particle transport in turbulent flow". Physics of Fluids, American Institute of Physics, Vol. 29, No. 5, pp. 055103.
- S. Dey and S. Z. Ali (2017). "Mechanics of sediment transport: Particle scale of entrainment to continuum scale of bedload flux". Journal of Engineering Mechanics, American Society of Civil Engineers (ASCE), Vol. 143, No. 11, pp. 04017127.
- S. Z. Ali and S. Dey (2017). "Origin of the scaling laws of sediment transport". Proceedings of the Royal Society A, London, UK, Vol. 473, Issue 2197, pp. 20160785.
- S. Z. Ali and S. Dey (2016). "Mechanics of advection of suspended particles in turbulent flow". Proceedings of the Royal Society A, London, UK, Vol. 472, Issue, 2195, pp. 20160749.
- S. Z. Ali and S. Dey (2016). "Hydrodynamics of sediment threshold". Physics of Fluids, American Institute of Physics, Vol. 28, No. 7, pp. 075103.
- S. Dey and R. Das (2012). "Gravel-bed hydrodynamics: A double-averaging approach". Journal of Hydraulic Engineering, American Society of Civil Engineers (ASCE), Vol. 138, No. 8, pp. 707–725.
- S. Dey, S. Sarkar and F. Ballio (2011). "Double-averaging turbulence characteristics in seeping rough-bed streams". Journal of Geophysical Research, Earth Surface, American Geophysical Union, Vol. 116, F03020, doi:10.1029/2010JF001832
- S. Dey, T. K. Nath and S. K. Bose (2010). "Submerged wall-jets subjected to injection and suction from the wall". Journal of Fluid Mechanics, Cambridge University Press, UK, Vol. 653, pp. 57–97.
- R. Gaudio, R. Miglio and S. Dey (2010). "Nonuniversality of von Kármán's κ in fluvial streams". Journal of Hydraulic Research, International Association for Hydraulic Research (IAHR), Vol. 48, No. 5, pp. 658–663.
- S. K. Bose and S. Dey (2010). "Universal probability distributions of turbulence in open channel flows". Journal of Hydraulic Research, International Association for Hydraulic Research (IAHR), Vol. 48, No. 3, pp, 388–394.
- S. K. Bose and S. Dey (2009). "Reynolds averaged theory of turbulent shear flow over undulating beds and formation of sand waves". Physical Review E, The American Physical Society, Vol. 80, pp. 036304.
- S. K. Bose and S. Dey (2007). "Theory of free surface flow over rough seeping beds". Proceedings of the Royal Society A, London, UK, Vol. 463, No. February, pp. 369–383.
- S. Dey and A. Sarkar (2006). "Response of velocity and turbulence in submerged wall jets to abrupt changes from smooth to rough beds and its application to scour downstream of an apron". Journal of Fluid Mechanics, Cambridge University Press, UK, Vol. 556, pp. 387–419.
- S. Dey (2002). "Secondary boundary layer and wall shear for fully developed flow in curved pipes". Proceedings of the Royal Society A, London, UK, Vol. 458, No. February, pp. 283–294.
- S. Dey (1999). "Sediment threshold". Applied Mathematical Modelling, Elsevier, Vol. 23, No. 5, pp. 399–417.
- S. Dey, S. K. Bose and G. L. N. Sastry (1995). "Clear water scour at circular piers: a model". Journal of Hydraulic Engineering, American Society of Civil Engineers (ASCE), Vol. 121, No. 12, pp. 869–876.
