= Wind profile power law =

Relationship of wind speeds at varying heights

The wind profile power law is a relationship between the wind speeds at one height, and those at another.

== Definition ==
The wind profile power law relationship is

$$\frac{u}{u_r} = \bigg(\frac{z}{z_r} \bigg)^\alpha$$

where $u$ is the wind speed (in metres per second) at height $z$ (in metres), and $u_r$ is the known wind speed at a reference height $z_r$. The exponent ($\alpha$) is an empirically derived coefficient that varies dependent upon the stability of the atmosphere. For neutral stability conditions, $\alpha$ is approximately 1/7, or 0.143.

In order to estimate the wind speed at a certain height z, the relationship would be rearranged to

$$u = u_r\bigg(\frac{z}{z_r} \bigg)^\alpha$$

The value of 1/7 for α is commonly assumed to be constant in wind resource assessments, because the differences between the two levels are not usually so great as to introduce substantial errors into the estimates (usually < 50 m). However, when a constant exponent is used, it does not account for the roughness of the surface, the displacement of calm winds from the surface due to the presence of obstacles (i.e., zero-plane displacement), or the stability of the atmosphere. In places where trees or structures impede the near-surface wind, the use of a constant 1/7 exponent may yield quite erroneous estimates, and the log wind profile is preferred. Even under neutral stability conditions, an exponent of 0.11 is more appropriate over open water (e.g., for offshore wind farms), than 0.143, which is more applicable over open land surfaces.

== Limits ==
The wind profile of the atmospheric boundary layer (surface to around 2000 metres) is generally logarithmic in nature and is best approximated using the log wind profile equation that accounts for surface roughness and atmospheric stability. The relationships between surface power and wind are often used as an alternative to logarithmic wind features when surface roughness or stability information is not available.

== Applications ==
The power law is often used in wind power assessments where wind speeds at the height of a turbine ( $\ge$ 50 metres) must be estimated from near surface wind observations (~10 metres), or where wind speed data at various heights must be adjusted to a standard height prior to use. Wind profiles are generated and used in a number of atmospheric pollution dispersion models.

=== Wind power density ===
Estimates of wind power density are presented as wind class, ranging from 1 to 7. The speeds are average wind speeds over the course of a year, although the frequency distribution of wind speed can provide different power densities for the same average wind speed.

| Class | 10 m (33 ft) | | 30 m (98 ft) | | 50 m (164 ft) | |
| Class | Wind power density (W/m^{2}) | Speed m/s (mph) | Wind power density (W/m^{2}) | Speed m/s (mph) | Wind power density (W/m^{2}) | Speed m/s (mph) |
|---|---|---|---|---|---|---|
| 1 | 0 - 100 | 0 - 4.4 (0 - 9.8) | 0 - 160 | 0 - 5.1 (0 - 11.4) | 0 - 200 | 0 - 5.6 (0 - 12.5) |
| 2 | 100 - 150 | 4.4 - 5.1 (9.8 - 11.5) | 160 - 240 | 5.1 - 5.9 (11.4 - 13.2) | 200 - 300 | 5.6 - 6.4 (12.5 - 14.3) |
| 3 | 150 - 200 | 5.1 - 5.6 (11.5 - 12.5) | 240 - 320 | 5.9 - 6.5 (13.2 - 14.6) | 300 - 400 | 6.4 - 7.0 (14.3 - 15.7) |
| 4 | 200 - 250 | 5.6 - 6.0 (12.5 - 13.4) | 320 - 400 | 6.5 - 7.0 (14.6 - 15.7) | 400 - 500 | 7.0 - 7.5 (15.7 - 16.8) |
| 5 | 250 - 300 | 6.0 - 6.4 (13.4 - 14.3) | 400 - 480 | 7.0 - 7.4 (15.7 - 16.6) | 500 - 600 | 7.5 - 8.0 (16.8 - 17.9) |
| 6 | 300 - 400 | 6.4 - 7.0 (14.3 - 15.7) | 480 - 640 | 7.4 - 8.2 (16.6 - 18.3) | 600 - 800 | 8.0 - 8.8 (17.9 - 19.7) |
| 7 | 400 - 1000 | 7.0 - 9.4 (15.7 - 21.1) | 640 - 1600 | 8.2 - 11.0 (18.3 - 24.7) | 800 - 2000 | 8.8 - 11.9 (19.7 - 26.6) |

== See also ==
- Log wind profile
