= University of North Bengal =

Public university in Siliguri, West Bengal, India

- Motto: samāno mantraḥ samitiḥ samānī (Common/united be your counsel, common be your assembly)
- Motto in English: Enlightenment to Perfection
- Type: Public research university
- Established: 1962 (64 years ago)
- Accreditation: NAAC
- Affiliations: UGC; AIU
- Budget: ₹135.50 crore (US$14 million) (FY2026–27 est.)
- Chancellor: Governor of West Bengal
- Vice-Chancellor: Vacant
- Faculty: 228 faculty members (January, 2025)
- Students: 4,744 (2024-2025)
- Undergraduates: 435 (2024-2025)
- Postgraduates: 3,006 (2024-2025)
- Doctoral students: 1,303 (2024-2025)
- Location: Siliguri (HQ), West Bengal, India; 26°42′34.03″N 88°21′14.96″E
- Campus: Urban 347.4 acres (140.6 ha)
- Other Campuses: Danguajhar; Salt Lake
- Acronym: NBU
- Website: www.nbu.ac.in

The University of North Bengal (also North Bengal University, abbreviated as NBU) is a public state university in the North Bengal region of West Bengal, India. Its main campus is located in Raja Rammohanpur, Siliguri, Darjeeling district, in the Indian state of West Bengal. Its second campus is located in Danguajhar, Jalpaiguri in Jalpaiguri district and the third campus is located in Salt Lake, Kolkata. The university was established in 1962 by the Government of West Bengal. North Bengal University offers degrees in undergraduate, post-graduate, doctoral and post-doctoral programmes. It is accredited by NAAC with B++ grade.

== History ==
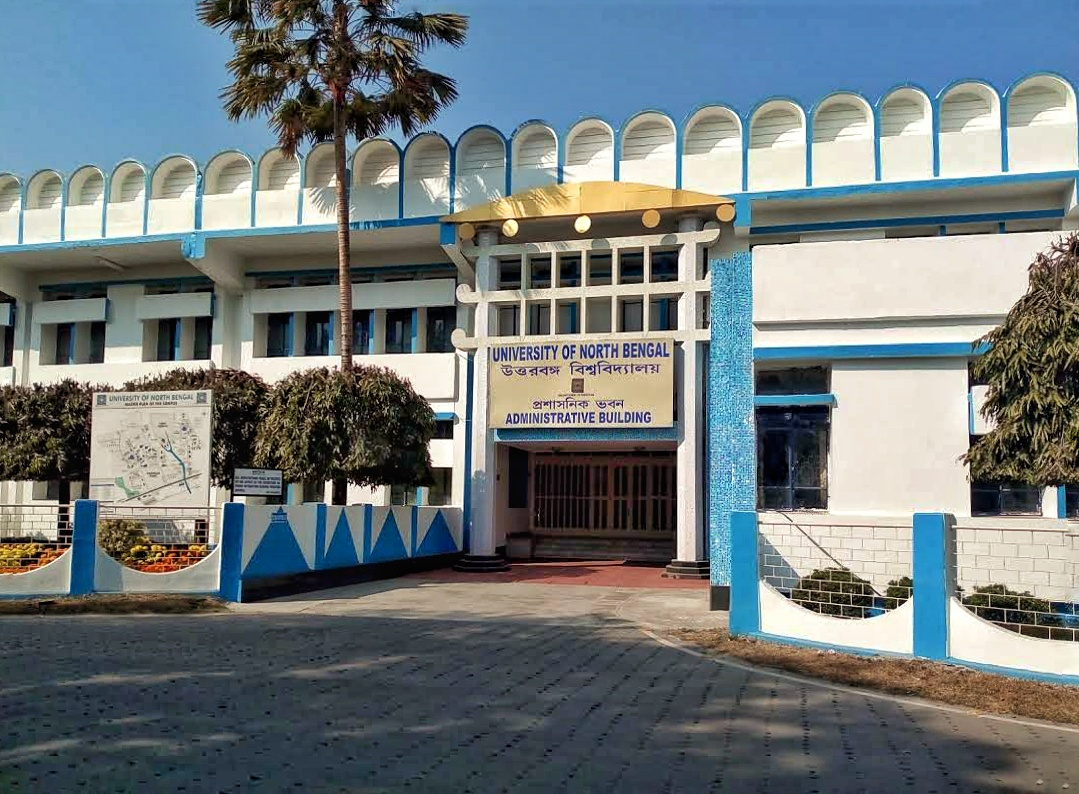
Administrative Building, University of North Bengal

The University of North Bengal was established by The North Bengal University Act, 1961 passed by the Legislature of West Bengal and the university started functioning in 1962. It was the first university in the North Bengal region. It initially served the predominantly rural areas in the six North Bengal districts of Darjeeling, Jalpaiguri, Cooch Behar, Malda, Uttar Dinajpur and Dakshin Dinajpur, and the neighbouring state of Sikkim.

In 2007, Sikkim University was established and all colleges of Sikkim were affiliated to it. In 2008, the University of Gour Banga was established and almost all the 28 colleges in Maldah, Uttar Dinajpur and Dakshin Dinajpur (with the exception of Raiganj University College) were affiliated to it. In 2012-13, Cooch Behar Panchanan Barma University was established with all the colleges of Cooch Behar district and Alipurduar subdivision of Jalpaiguri district affiliated to it.

The University of North Bengal presently has jurisdiction over the districts of Darjeeling, Kalimpong, Alipurduar and Jalpaiguri.

== Campuses ==
The main campus is spread over an area of 330 acres (1.3 km^{2}) and lies between Siliguri and Bagdogra Airport in the Terai region of Darjeeling district. The second campus is in Danguajhar, Jalpaiguri. The third campus is located in Salt Lake, Kolkata.

The university has an annual enrollment of more than 36,000 undergraduate students and more than 1,500 postgraduate students and scholars.

== Organisation and administration ==
=== Governance ===
The Vice-chancellor of the University of North Bengal is the chief executive officer of the university. Currently, the post of Vice-Chancellor of the university is vacant.

List of All Vice-Chancellors
- B. N. Dasgupta, 1 Jun 1962 – 31 May 1966; A. C. Roy, 1 Jun 1966 – 31 May 1970; P. C. Mukherjee, 1 Jun 1970 - 7 Nov 1974; Amlan Dutta, 8 Nov 1974 - 20 Nov 1977; Prasad Kr. Ghosh, 21 Nov 1977 - 18 Apr 1982; S. N. Sen (acting), 19 Apr 1982 - 9 Sep 1982; H. Bhowmik (acting), 10 Sep 1982 - 14 Sep 1982; D. B. Dutta, 15 Sep 1982 - 31 Aug 1988; K. N. Chatterjee, 1 Sep 1988 - 31 Dec 1995; R. G. Mukherjee, 1 Jan 1996 - 31 Dec 1999; Pijush Kanti Saha, 1 Jan 2000 - 31 Dec 2007; A. Basu Majumdar, 1 Jan 2009 - 31 Mar 2012; Samir Kumar Das, 1 Apr 2012 - 10 Feb 2014; Somnath Ghosh, 11 Feb 2014 - 10 Feb 2018; Subiresh Bhattacharyya, 22 Feb 2018 - 28 Sep 2022; Om Prakash Mishra (interim), 28 Sep 2022 - 21 May 2023; Sanchari Ray Mukherjee (acting), 22 May 2023 – 16 Jul 2023; Rathin Bandhopadhyay (interim), 17 Jul 2023 - 4 Oct 2023; C. M. Ravindran (interim), 5 Oct 2023 - 21 Apr 2024

=== Faculties and Departments ===
The University of North Bengal has 30 departments organized into two faculty councils.

Faculty of Science
Anthropology	Bio-Technology	Bioinformatics	Botany
Chemistry	Computer Science & Technology	Food Technology	Geography and Applied Geography
Geology	Mathematics	Microbiology	Pharmaceutical Technology
Physics	Tea Science	Zoology	
Faculty of Arts, Commerce & Law
Bangla	Commerce	Education	English
Hindi	History	Law	Library and Information Science
Lifelong Learning and Extension	Management	Mass Communication	Nepali
Philosophy	Sanskrit	Women's Studies	

=== Centres ===
The university offers affiliation to research and academic centres on and off-campus.

Centre For Studies
- University Science & Instrumentation Centre
- Computer Centre
- Centre for Development Studies
- Centre for Himalayan Studies
- Centre for High Energy & Cosmic Ray
- Centre for Remote Sensing Application
- Centre for Tea Management
- Centre for Mass Communication
- Centre for Himalayan Studies
- Centre for Women's Studies
- Center for Social Research
- Centre for Studies in Local Language and Culture
- Centre for Tourism and Hotel Management
- Centre for Marketing Management
- Centre for Ambedkar Studies
- Centre for Innovative Studies
- North Bengal University Research Centre on Diplomacy and War

=== Affiliations ===
The university has several affiliated colleges spread over four districts of Darjeeling, Kalimpong, Alipurduar and Jalpaiguri, and one sub-division Islampur of Uttar Dinajpur district.

=== Academics ===
The University of North Bengal offers four-year (B.A./B.Sc./B.Com.) undergraduate degrees and a five-year B.A. LLB degree. It also offers two-year M.A., M.Com., M.B.A., M.Sc., M.C.A. and M.Pharm degrees, two-year MPhil degrees and PhD degrees.

=== Accreditation ===
In 2022, the university was accredited with a CGPA of 2.82 on a seven point scale at "B++" Grade by the National Assessment and Accreditation Council (NAAC), valid for a period of 5 years.

=== Museum ===
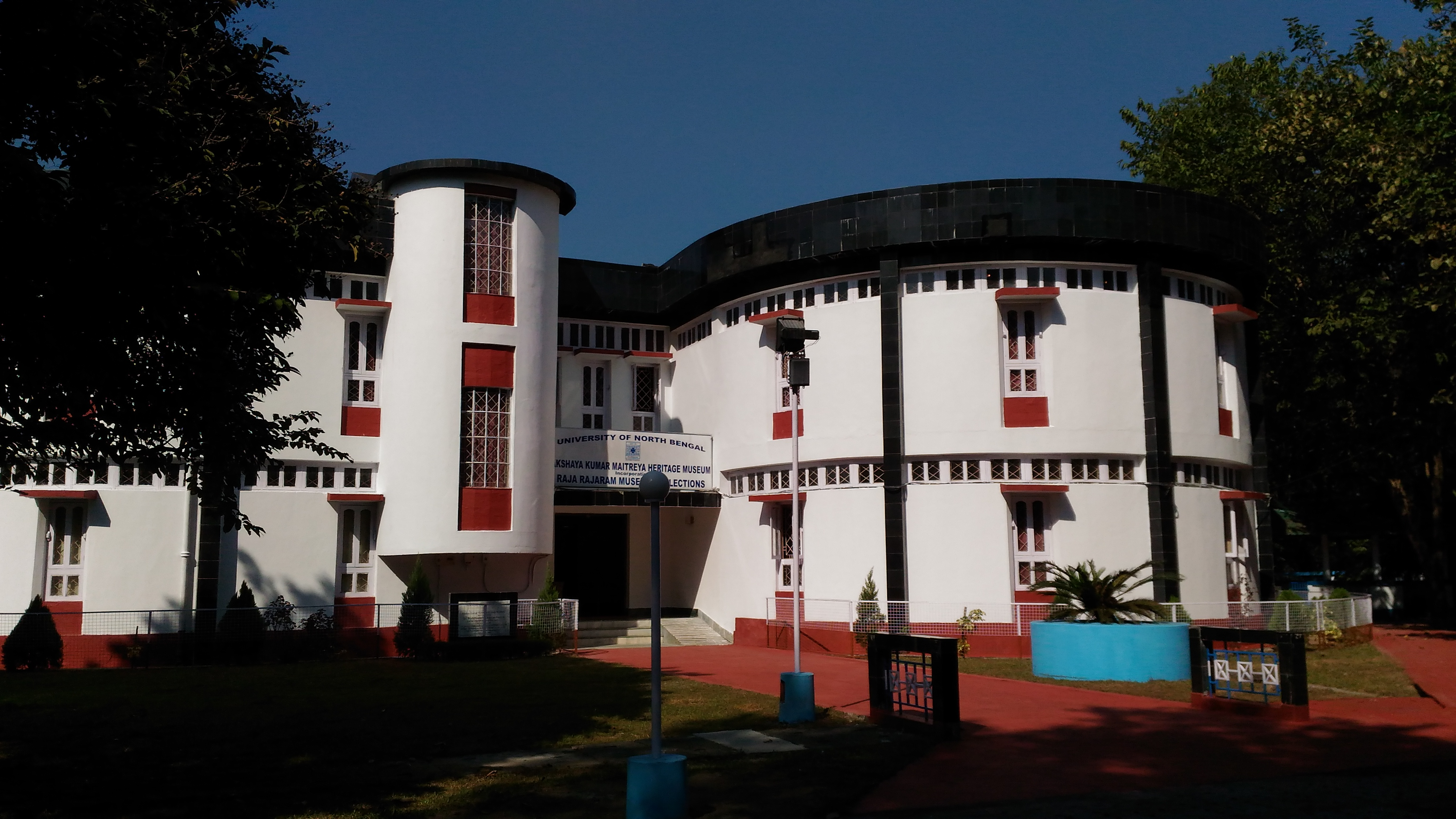
Museum of the University

The Akshaya Kumar Maitreya Heritage Museum incorporating the Raja Rajaram Museum Collection was established in the University of North Bengal in February 1965. The museum is now a repository for sculpture, coins, paintings and manuscripts among other things related to the history of North Bengal. It is also a regional museum and is one of the few university museums in India. It collects, preserves and studies archaeological relics discovered in the region.

== Notable alumni ==
- Abdul Karim Chowdhury, former Minister of Mass Education Extension and Library Services in the Government of West Bengal
- Bhim Hang Limboo, Minister of Public Health Engineering of Sikkim
- Charu Majumdar, founder of the Communist Party of India
- Chokila Iyer, India's first female foreign secretary
- Danny Denzongpa, Indian actor, singer and film director
- Dipak Giri, Indian writer and academic
- Jyoti Prakash Tamang, Indian food technologist, microbiologist
- Mahima Chaudhry, Indian actress and model
- Parthasarathi Chakraborty, Indian environmental geochemist, a former senior scientist
- Prem Singh Tamang, Chief Minister of Sikkim
- Ranjan Ghosh (academic), Indian writer and academic
- Sabina Yeasmin, Indian Cabinet Minister of State
- Sanjay Hansda, Executive Director of the Reserve Bank of India
- Sourav Chakraborty, Chairman of Siliguri Jalpaiguri Development Authority
- Sreerupa Mitra Chaudhury, social worker, women's rights activist
- Subhasish Dey, hydraulician and educator
- Sukanta Majumdar, 10th President of Bharatiya Janata Party, West Bengal; Member of Parliament, Lok Sabha
- Sumana Roy, Indian writer and poet
