= Ventura County Air Pollution Control District =

Air pollution agency of Ventura County, California, U.S.

Agency overview
- Formed: 1968
- Headquarters: 4567 Telephone Road, Second Floor Ventura, CA, California
- Employees: 47
- Annual budget: $9,216,230
- Agency executive: Ali Reza Ghasemi, Air Pollution Control Officer
- Website: http://www.vcapcd.org

The Ventura County Air Pollution Control District (VCAPCD) protects public health and agriculture from the adverse effects of air pollution by identifying problems and developing a comprehensive program to achieve and maintain state and federal air quality standards. The Ventura County Board of Supervisors formed the district in response to the county's first air pollution study, which found the area had a severe air quality problem.

Currently, Ventura County does not meet state or federal standards for ozone or the state standard for particulate matter with a diameter up to 10 micrometers, or PM10.

== Organizational structure ==
The district is governed by the Air Pollution Control Board. This 10-member board consists of the Ventura County Board of Supervisors and five elected officials representing Ventura County cities. The Air Pollution Control Board establishes policy, approves new rules and appoints the Air Pollution Control Officer and members of the Hearing Board, Advisory Committee and Clean Air Fund Advisory Committee. The Air Pollution Control Officer makes policy recommendations to the Air Pollution Control Board, implements the board's decisions and directs the staff.

=== Ventura County Air Pollution Control Board ===
The current members are Chair Vianey Lopez, Vice Chair Martha R. McQueen-Legohn, Liz Campos, Jeff Gorrell, Matt LaVere, Kelly Long, Albert Mendez, Janice S. Parvin, Andrew K. Whitman and John Zaragoza.:

=== Divisions ===
The district's employees include engineers, inspectors, planners, technicians and support staff. They are grouped into the following divisions:

- Compliance
- Engineering
- Fiscal and Administration
- Information Systems
- Monitoring
- Planning, Rules and Incentives
- Public Information

=== Hearing Board ===
The Air Pollution Control District Hearing Board is an independent quasi-judicial body established by state law to grant variances and uphold or overturn district decisions regarding denials of and the operating conditions of permits. It also may revoke permits to operate, issue orders of abatement, allow citizen appeals and settle disputes between the district and permit holders.

The Hearing Board consists of five members appointed by the Air Pollution Control Board for three-year terms.

Current members are Chair Valarie Grossman, Mike Stubblefield, Victor Kamhi, Dr. Lewis Kanter and Kathleen Paulson:

=== Advisory Committee ===
The members of the Air Pollution Control District Advisory Committee are appointed by the Air Pollution Control Board. The committee was created to ensure that private citizens, health and environmental organizations, government agencies and industry representatives have an in-depth forum to discuss district rule development and air pollution concerns. The committee reviews staff proposals for new and revised rules and makes recommendations to the Air Pollution Control Board.

Current members are Chair Sara Head, Vice Chair Paul Meehan, Donald Bird, Joan Burns, Edward Carloni, Steve Colome, Leslie Cornejo, Stephen Frank, Jan Hauser, Rainford Hunter, Mary Kennedy, Thomas Lucas, Kirsten Marble, Hugh McTernan, Richard Nick and Arecely Preciado.

== Objectives ==
The district's main goals are to:

- Attain federal and state ambient air quality standards.
- Implement the requirements of the California Clean Air Act and the federal Clean Air Act.
- Conduct public awareness and education programs.
- Develop attainment plans for new U.S. Environmental Protection Agency (EPA) ambient air quality standards.
- Minimize the socioeconomic impacts of clean air programs.
- Implement California Air Resources Board regulations to reduce greenhouse gas emissions at landfills and at oil production and refrigeration facilities.

Major district programs include:

- Air Quality Management Plan development and implementation.
- Permit processing and renewal.
- Enforcement of district rules and applicable state and federal laws.
- Air quality and meteorological monitoring at five locations throughout the county.
- Air quality impact analyses of sources and projects.
- Air quality and meteorological forecasting.
- Declaring agricultural burn days based on forecasts.
- Rule development.
- Air pollution emissions inventory.
- Air toxics inventory and risk assessment.
- Employer transportation outreach.
- Incentives for emission-reduction projects.
- Public information and education.
- Implementation of delegated state climate change measures.
- Community Air Protection implementation.

== See also ==
- California Air Resources Board
- California Code of Regulations
- California Environmental Protection Agency
- Ecology of California
- Emission standards
- Greenhouse gas
- Greenhouse gas emissions by the United States
- List of California Air Districts
- NAAQS (National Ambient Air Quality Standards)
- NESHAP (National Emissions Standards for Hazardous Air Pollutants)
- Pollution in California
- Public Smog
- Timeline of major US environmental and occupational health regulation
- US Emission standard
