= South Coast Air Basin =

The South Coast Air Basin—SCAB (or SoCAB) is one of several regional air basin areas designated by the state of California, for the purpose of air quality management and air pollution control in Southern California. The SCAB district was created in 1969. and includes all of Orange County and the non-desert regions of Los Angeles County, Riverside County, and San Bernardino County. The region covers approximately 17100 km^{2} and includes much of the Greater Los Angeles Area, which is home to approximately 18 million people.

== South Coast Air Quality Management District—AQMD ==
Initially, the SCAB had four air-quality management agencies, one for each of the four counties. In 1977, the legislature merged these four agencies into the South Coast Air Quality Management District—South Coast AQMD.

The SCAB is the smoggiest region of the U.S., and the South Coast AQMD provides hourly reports throughout the district. The South Coast AQMD has jurisdiction over stationary sources of pollution, while the California Air Resources Board has jurisdiction for mobile sources of pollution, including automobiles and trucks.

Since 2011 the South Coast AQMD also manages portions of two other desert air basins: the Salton Sea Air Basin in Riverside County, and the Mojave Desert Air Basin in Los Angeles, Kern, and San Bernardino Counties.

=== South Coast AQMD governing board ===
The governing board has thirteen members selected by a combination of city, county, and state agencies.

"The South Coast Air Quality Management District is the regional government agency responsible for air pollution control. AQMD regulations must be approved by the state Air Resources Board and the U.S. Environmental Protection Agency."

== See also ==
- Air pollution in California
- California Air Resources Board

South Coast Air Basin

- Inland Empire
- Los Angeles Basin
- Pomona Valley
- San Bernardino Valley
- San Fernando Valley
- San Gabriel Valley
- South Coast (California)
