= South Coast Air Quality Management District =

California air pollution agency

South Coast Air Quality Management District (SCAQMD)
Agency overview
- Preceding agency: Los Angeles County Air Pollution Control District
- Headquarters: Diamond Bar, CA United States
- Agency executive: Wayne Nastri, Executive Officer
- Website: http://www.aqmd.gov/

The South Coast Air Quality Management District, also using the acronym South Coast (AQMD), formed in 1976, is the air pollution agency responsible for regulating stationary sources of air pollution in the South Coast Air Basin and the Coachella Valley portion of the Salton Sea Air Basin, in Southern California. The separate California Air Resources Board is responsible for regulating mobile sources (e.g. vehicles) in the air basin.

== Basin geography ==
The South Coast AQMD includes all of Orange County; and the non-desert regions of Los Angeles County, San Bernardino County, and Riverside County including the Coachella Valley.

The South Coast Air Basin area encompassed by the South Coast AQMD amounts to about 10,750 square miles (27,850 square kilometres) and is the second most populated area in the United States. This area has a severe problem with smog, and the South Coast AQMD has been a leader in the nation's efforts to reduce air pollution emissions. The main office is located in the city of Diamond Bar.

== Operations ==
South Coast AQMD develops, adopts and implements an Air Quality Management Plan for bringing the area into compliance with the clean air standards established by national and state governmental legislation.

Air quality and permissible air pollutant emission "rules" are promulgated to reduce emissions from various sources, including specific types of equipment, industrial processes, paints, solvents and certain consumer products. Permits are issued to the pertinent industries and businesses to enforce compliance with the air quality and emission rules, and South Coast AQMD staff conducts periodic inspections to ensure such compliance.

South Coast AQMD's rules apply to businesses ranging from large oil refineries and power plants to gasoline (petrol) fueling stations and dry cleaning plants. There are about 30,000 such businesses operating under South Coast AQMD permits. In general, the agency is limited to establishing rules for regulating stationary sources. Emission standards for mobile sources (automobiles, trucks, buses, railroads, airplanes and marine vessels) are established by the U.S. Environmental Protection Agency and the California Air Resources Board.

=== Air quality monitoring network ===
South Coast AQMD also operates an extensive network of air quality monitoring stations (about 40 stations) and issues daily air quality forecasts. The forecasts are made available to the public through newspapers, television, radio, its award-winning smartphone application, social media, its website, and a toll-free Smog Update telephone line.

=== Air quality and air pollution dispersion modeling ===
The air quality modeling activities of the South Coast AQMD are one of the functions of the Planning, Rule Development and Area Sources section. That section is also responsible for oversight and commenting upon air pollution dispersion modeling studies performed as part of any environmental impact studies that may be reviewed by or requested by South Coast AQMD. The models that may be utilized include:

- California Line Source Dispersion Model (CALINE-4)
- AERMOD Model
- Hotspots Analysis and Reporting Program (HARP)
- U.S. Environmental Protection Agency (EPA)'s Air Quality Models
- California Air Resources Board (CARB)'s Air Quality Models

=== Indirect source rule ===
The SCAQMD has authority to regulate stationary sources of air pollution. These include warehouses which induce truck trips, and thus qualify as indirect sources of air pollution. In 2021, the SCAQMD board voted to authorize the Indirect Source Rule, which requires warehouses larger than 100,000 square feet to take steps to cut pollution, fund similar air pollution mitigation projects, or face penalties. The Inland Empire has experienced substantial development of warehouses which serve the e-commerce industry.

The indirect source rule's main program is the Warehouse Actions and Investments to Reduce Emissions (WAIRE). Under WAIRE, affected warehouses must earn WAIRE points to provide incentives to reduce emissions from trucks which serve them. They can earn points by operating electric trucks or other zero-emissions vehicle, installing charging station or solar panels, or paying to install particulate filters at local schools. Warehouse operators that do not earn sufficient points must pay mitigation fees.

On August 2, 2024, the air district board unanimously voted to authorize a new indirect source rule to reduce nitrogen oxide emissions from railyards in the district. The rule would apply to 25 facilities and would require the facility or all facilities operated by the same operator in the state of California to reduce emissions a specified percentage over the projected baseline or demonstrate that through reduced throughput the facility had a reduced Aggregate Emission Factor. The rule builds upon the CARB In-Use Locomotive rule and the Advanced Clean Fleet rule that have yet to be approved by the EPA and thus the rule cannot go into effect until those are approved. The rule is expected to prevent 300 premature deaths and 2100 hospitalizations annually. After the inauguration of Donald Trump in 2025, CARB withdrew its Advanced Clean Fleet Rule and the In-Use Locomotive Rule, and so the SCAQMD railyard indirect source rule cannot go into effect.

== Governing board ==
South Coast AQMD has a Governing Board of 13 members. Ten of the members are county supervisors and city council members. The remaining three are appointed by California state officials. Current members of the Governing Board include:

- Vanessa Delgado (Chair), California State Senate Rules Committee appointee
- Michael A. Cacciotti (Vice Chair), Eastern Los Angeles County Cities
- Janet Nguyen, Orange County Supervisor
- Nithya Raman, Los Angeles City Council
- Vacant, Governor's appointee
- Holly Mitchell, Los Angeles County Supervisor
- Larry McCallon, San Bernardino County cities
- Veronica Padilla-Campos, California State Assembly Speaker appointee
- V. Manuel Perez, Riverside County Board of Supervisor
- Brenda Olmos, Western Los Angeles County cities
- Carlos Rodriguez, Orange County cities
- Curt Hagman, San Bernardino County Supervisor
- Patricia Lock Dawson, Riverside County cities^{†}

^{†}South Coast AQMD's appointee to the California Air Resources Board

The representative for Orange County cities is chosen by the 34 members of the Orange County City Selection Committee. Appointment requires both a majority vote of the committee and a majority vote when weighted by population. In November 2015, Republicans blocked reappointment of Santa Ana Mayor Miguel Pulido, a Democrat, to the board, voting to replace him with Republican Lake Forest Councilman Dwight Robinson.

== Administration ==
The chief Executive Officer of the South Coast AQMD reports to the Governing Board. The following departments report to the Executive Officer:

=== Administrative departments ===
- Legal
  - Counsel
  - Prosecutor
- Legislative, Public Affairs, and Media
- Finance
- Human Resources
- Information Management

=== Operational departments ===
- Engineering and Permitting
- Compliance and Enforcement
- Planning, Rule Development and Implementation
- Monitoring and Analysis
- Technology Advancement Office

== Funding for South Coast AQMD ==
South Coast AQMD utilizes a system of evaluation fees, annual operating fees, emission fees, Hearing Board fees, penalties/ settlements and investments that generate around 73% of its revenue. The remaining 27% of its revenue is from federal grants, California Air Resources (CARB) subvention funds, and California Clean Air Act Motor Vehicle fees.

== See also ==
- South Coast Air Basin
- California Air Resources Board
- California Department of Toxic Substances Control
- AP 42 Compilation of Air Pollutant Emission Factors
- Environmental remediation
- Hal Bernson — former board member.
- Clean Air Act (1990)
- Clean Air Act (1970)
- List of California air districts
- U.S. Environmental Protection Agency dispersion models
- National Ambient Air Quality Standards—NAAQS
- National Emissions Standards for Hazardous Air Pollutants—NESHAP
- PHEV Research Center
- Public Smog
- Ventura County Air Pollution Control District
