= Valarm =

- Company type: Private
- Industry: Water Resources Management, Chemical Distribution, Air Quality Monitoring, Tracking Vehicles with Industrial Equipment
- Founded: 2012
- Founders: Lorenzo Gonzalez, Edward Pultar, Pawel Sasik, Scott Orlyck, Smith Long
- Headquarters: California
- Products: tools.valarm.net
- Services: Remote Monitoring, Industrial IoT, Internet of Things, Sensors, Telemetry, Air Pollution and Water Monitoring
- Website: valarm.net

Valarm is a technology company that makes software for remote monitoring and Industrial IoT.

The company was founded in 2012 by two brothers: Lorenzo Gonzalez and Edward Pultar. Valarm is based in the Los Angeles area of California, USA.

Valarm has assisted government agencies deploying remote monitoring systems, including:

- Air quality and pollution monitoring with South Coast Air Quality Management District (SC - AQMD), the government agency responsible for air quality monitoring and compliance in Southern California
- Flood monitoring systems for measuring water levels in Virginia Beach, Virginia
- Monitoring temperatures and other environmental sensors for agriculture and vineyards
- Early warning systems, monitoring water levels risks, and flooding in Newport News, Virginia
