= Bay Area Air Quality Management District =

Coordinates: 37.7879°N 122.3915°W

Bay Area Air District (BAAD)
Agency overview
- Formed: November 16, 1955
- Jurisdiction: San Francisco Bay Area
- Headquarters: 375 Beale Street, Suite 600 San Francisco, CA 94105
- Employees: ≈400
- Agency executive: Philip M. Fine, Ph.D.
- Website: http://www.baaqmd.gov/

The Bay Area Air District, formerly Bay Area Air Quality Management District or BAAQMD, is a public agency that regulates the stationary sources of air pollution in the nine counties of California's San Francisco Bay Area: Alameda, Contra Costa, Marin, Napa, San Francisco, San Mateo, Santa Clara, southwestern Solano, and southern Sonoma. The Air District is governed by a 24-member Board of Directors composed of elected officials from each of the nine Bay Area counties. The board has the duty of adopting air pollution regulations for the district. It is one of 35 Air Quality Management Districts in California.

The District launched the now-current name and brand logo in January 2025.

== History ==
The first meeting of the Bay Area Air Pollution Control District (as it was initially known) board of directors was on November 16, 1955, possessing the duty of regulating the sources of stationary air pollution in the San Francisco Bay Area, that is, most sources of air pollution with the exception of automobiles and aircraft.

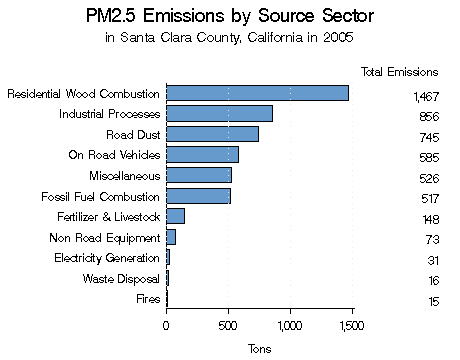
Sources of particulate pollution in Santa Clara County, CA. For comparison, the total tons of PM 2.5 from wood combustion statewide is 39.756 tons per year. So Santa Clara County accounts for 4% of the PM 2.5 from wood burning.

- 1957 - The Air District banned open burning at wrecking yards;
- 1958 - The Air District limited industrial emissions in 1958;
- 1958 - the Air District opened its first analytical laboratory;
- 1960 - The Air District banned open burning at dumps;
- 1962 - Ambient air monitoring network established;
- 1968 - The Air District later began to regulate agricultural burning in 1968;
- 1970 - Backyard burning banned;
- 1971 - the Air District adopted emissions standards for lead;
- 1971 - Napa, Solano, and Sonoma counties became members of the Air District;
- 1972 - The Air District began making daily air quality broadcasts through the "smog phone";
- 1972 - The board adopted the first odor regulation in the United States;
- 1974 - California's first gasoline vapor recovery program was started;
- 1975 - The country's first air quality ozone model was completed by the Air District;
- 1978 - The Bay Area Air Pollution Control District changed its name to the Bay Area Air Quality Management District;
- 1980 - The Air District proposed a "Smog Check" program, one that would be adopted statewide by 1982.
- 1989 - The Air District adopted the nation's first limits on emissions from commercial bakeries and marine vessel loading;
- 1990 - The Air District adopted regulations for emissions from aerosol spray products;
- 1991 - The Spare the Air program was started, made to notify the public of when air quality is forecast to exceed federal standards;
- 1996 - The Air District founded its vehicle buyback program, intended to buy and scrap older, more polluting automobiles;
- 1998 - The Air District began administrating the Carl Moyer Program to reduce emissions by upgrading heavy-duty diesel engines;
- 1998 and 1999 - The Air District took steps to reduce particulate matter, primarily through regulating woodburning appliances and monitoring particulate matter through pre-existing air quality monitoring stations;
- 2005 - The Air District began to regulate emissions from refinery flares;
- 2008 - The Board passed a law that makes the previously voluntary compliance with wood burning regulations a crime. Citizens wishing to use wood burning appliances during winter months now must check if a Spare the Air alert is in effect, which would prohibit residential wood burning, with certain exemptions.

== Governing board ==
The Air District's board of directors is made up of 24 locally appointed representatives from 9 Bay Area counties. Each county's population determines the number of representatives on the Board, as follows:

- < 300,000: 1 representative each (Marin and Napa)
- 300,000-750,000: 2 representatives each (Solano and Sonoma)
- 750,000-1,000,000: 3 representatives each (San Francisco and San Mateo)
- >1,000,000: 4 representatives each (Alameda, Contra Costa, and Santa Clara)

Board members are appointed by their County's Board of Supervisors and/or their County's City Selection Committee.

In addition, the Board has 12 standing committees on which the board members sit.

== Uses of data ==
The Bay Area Air District oversees regional data on air pollution and has the authority to declare Spare the Air alerts, when residents should take extra precautions when going outside and may be prohibited from engaging in activities such as burning. 511 Contra Costa built an RSS feed using these data, and released an iPhone application to alert people with allergies or other environmental sensitivities about air quality alerts.

== Divisions ==
Administration: http://www.baaqmd.gov/Divisions/Administration.aspx

Communications: https://www.baaqmd.gov/news-and-events/press-releases

Compliance & Enforcement: http://www.baaqmd.gov/Divisions/Compliance-and-Enforcement.aspx

Engineering: http://www.baaqmd.gov/Divisions/Engineering.aspx

Finance: http://www.baaqmd.gov/Divisions/Finance.aspx

Human Resources: http://www.baaqmd.gov/Divisions/Human-Resources.aspx

Information Services: http://www.baaqmd.gov/Divisions/Information-Services.aspx

Legal: http://www.baaqmd.gov/Divisions/Legal.aspx

Planning, Rules & Research: http://www.baaqmd.gov/Divisions/Planning-and-Research.aspx

Strategic Incentives: http://www.baaqmd.gov/Divisions/Strategic-Incentives.aspx

Technical Services: http://www.baaqmd.gov/Divisions/Technical-Services.aspx

== Notable facilities in jurisdiction ==
Some example stationary sources in the Air District's jurisdiction are:

- The Shaw Group waste ponds, Martinez, CA
- Pacific Gas and Electric
- Shell Oil refinery, Martinez, CA
- Chevron Corporation refinery, Richmond, CA

== See also ==
- Spare the Air
- Carl Moyer Program
- Association of Bay Area Governments
- Metropolitan Transportation Commission (San Francisco Bay Area)
- California Air Resources Board
- South Coast Air Quality Management District
- List of California air districts
