= California Air Resources Board =

Clean air agency in California, United States

- Logo

Agency overview
- Formed: 1967
- Preceding agencies: Bureau of Air Sanitation; Motor Vehicle Pollution Control Board
- Jurisdiction: California
- Headquarters: 1001 I Street, Sacramento, California
- Employees: 1,994 (2024)
- Annual budget: US$1.005 billion (2024-25)
- Agency executive: Lauren Sanchez, Chair
- Parent agency: California Environmental Protection Agency
- Website: https://ww2.arb.ca.gov/

The California Air Resources Board (CARB or ARB) is an agency of the government of California that aims to reduce air pollution. Established in 1967 when then-governor Ronald Reagan signed the Mulford-Carrell Act, combining the Bureau of Air Sanitation and the Motor Vehicle Pollution Control Board, CARB is a department within the cabinet-level California Environmental Protection Agency.

The stated goals of CARB include attaining and maintaining healthy air quality; protecting the public from exposure to toxic air contaminants; and providing innovative approaches for complying with air pollution rules and regulations. CARB has also been instrumental in driving innovation throughout the global automotive industry through programs such as its ZEV mandate.

One of CARB's responsibilities is to define vehicle emissions standards. California is the only state permitted to issue emissions standards under the federal Clean Air Act, subject to a waiver from the United States Environmental Protection Agency. Other states may choose to follow CARB or the federal vehicle emission standards, but may not set their own.

== Governance ==
California Air Resources Board leadership
| Name | Affiliation | Appointed | Term ends |
|---|---|---|---|
| Lauren Sanchez | Chair | September 2025 | December 31, 2026 |
| Cliff Rechtschaffen | Public Member | September 2023 | December 31, 2024 |
| John R. Balmes, MD | Physician | December 2007 | December 31, 2027 |
| Hector De La Torre | Assembly | June 2018 | January 1, 2025 |
| John Eisenhut | Agriculture | August 2013 | December 31, 2029 |
| Paula Stigler Granados | San Diego APCD | February 2026 | December 31, 2030 |
| Dean Florez | Senate | February 2016 | December 31, 2024 |
| Corey A. Jackson, DSW | Ex Officio (Assembly) | February 2025 | |
| Lynda Hopkins | Bay Area AQMD | February 2025 | December 31, 2026 |
| Patricia Lock Dawson | South Coast AQMD | April 2025 | December 31, 2026 |
| Henry Stern | Ex Officio (Senate) | January 2023 | |
| Tania Pacheco-Werner, PhD | San Joaquin Valley APCD | December 2020 | December 31, 2026 |
| Eric Guerra | Sacramento Region Air Districts Member | January 2023 | December 31, 2028 |
| Susan Shaheen, PhD | Automotive Member | January 2023 | December 31, 2028 |
| David Silva | Air District Member | March 2026 | December 31, 2028 |
| Diane Tavorkian | Public | August 31, 2018 | December 31, 2029 |

CARB's governing board is made up of 16 members, with two non-voting members appointed for legislative oversight, one each by the California State Assembly and Senate. Twelve of the 14 voting members are appointed by the governor and are subject to confirmation by the Senate: six from local air districts, four air pollution subject-matter experts, two members of the public, and the Chair. The other two voting members are appointed from environmental justice committees by the Assembly and Senate.

Six of the governor-appointed board members are chosen from regional air pollution control or air quality management districts. Five represent specifically designated districts or groups of districts: the Bay Area Air Quality Management District, San Diego County Air Pollution Control District, San Joaquin Valley Air Pollution Control District, South Coast Air Quality Management District, and one of several designated Sacramento-area districts. The sixth is a board member from any other California air district:

- Bay Area AQMD (San Francisco Bay Area), currently Lynda Hopkins
- San Diego County APCD, currently Paula Stigler Granados, PhD
- San Joaquin Valley APCD, currently Tania Pacheco-Werner, PhD
- South Coast AQMD, currently Patricia Lock Dawson
- A Sacramento-area district: Sacramento Metropolitan AQMD, Yolo-Solano AQMD, Placer County APCD, Feather River AQMD, or El Dorado County AQMD, currently Eric Guerra
- A local air district not specifically named above, currently represented by David Silva

Four governor-appointed board members are subject matter experts in specific fields: automotive engineering, currently Susan Shaheen, PhD; science, agriculture, or law, currently John Eisenhut; medicine, currently John R. Balmes, M.D.; and air pollution control. The governor is also responsible for two appointees from members of the public, and the final governor appointee is the Board's Chair. The first Chair of CARB was Dr. Arie Jan Haagen-Smit, who was previously a professor at the California Institute of Technology and started research into air pollution in 1948. Dr. Haagen-Smit is credited with discovering the source of smog in California, which led to the development of air pollution controls and standards. In honor of his legacy, CARB started the Haagen-Smit Clean Air Awards program in 2001 to recognize individuals who have had significant accomplishments in the field of air quality and climate change.

The two legislature-appointed board members work directly with communities affected by air pollution. They are currently Hector De La Torre and Dean Florez, appointed by the Assembly and Senate respectively.

== Organizational structure ==
CARB is a part of the California Environmental Protection Agency, an organization which reports directly to the Governor's Office in the Executive Branch of California State Government.

CARB has 15 divisions and offices:

- Office of the Chair
- Executive Office
- Office of Community Air Protection
- Air Quality Planning and Science Division
- Emission Certification and Compliance Division
- Enforcement Division
- Industrial Strategies Division
- Mobile Source Control Division
- Mobile Source Laboratory Division
- Monitoring and Laboratory Division
- Research Division
- Sustainable Transportation and Communities Division
- Transportation and Toxics Division
- Office of Information Services
- Administrative Services Division

=== Air Quality Planning and Science Division ===
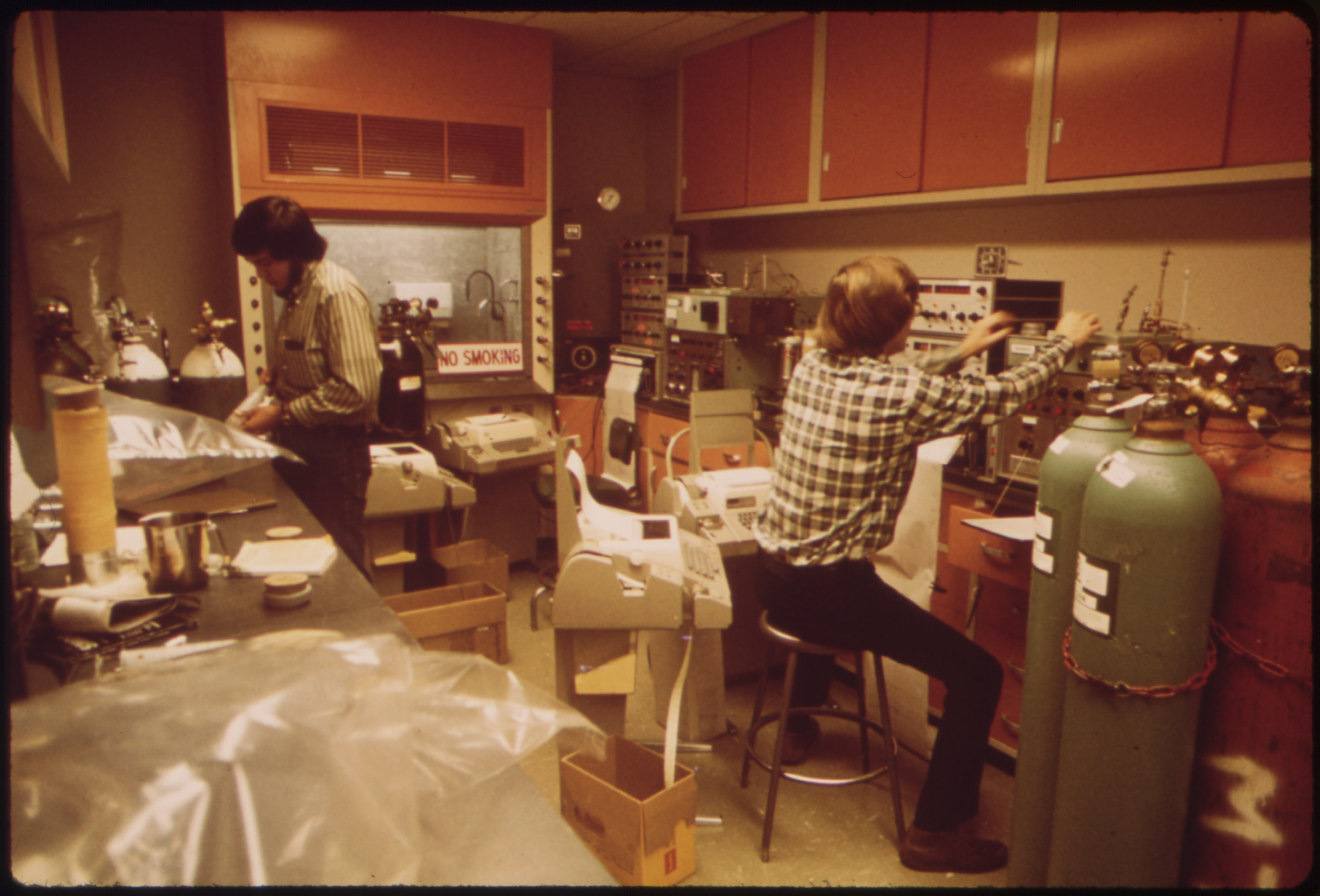
California Air Resources Board Laboratory, Los Angeles, in 1973

The division assesses the extent of California's air quality problems and the progress being made to abate them, coordinates statewide development of clean air plans and maintains databases pertinent to air quality and emissions. The division's technical support work provides a basis for clean air plans and CARB's regulatory programs. This support includes management and interpretation of emission inventories, air quality data, meteorological data and of air quality modeling.

The Air Quality Planning and Science Division has five branches:

- Special Assessment Branch
- Emission inventory and Economic Analysis Branch
- Modeling & Meteorology Branch
- Air quality Planning Branch
- Mobile Source Analysis Branch
- Consumer Products and Air Quality Assessment Branch

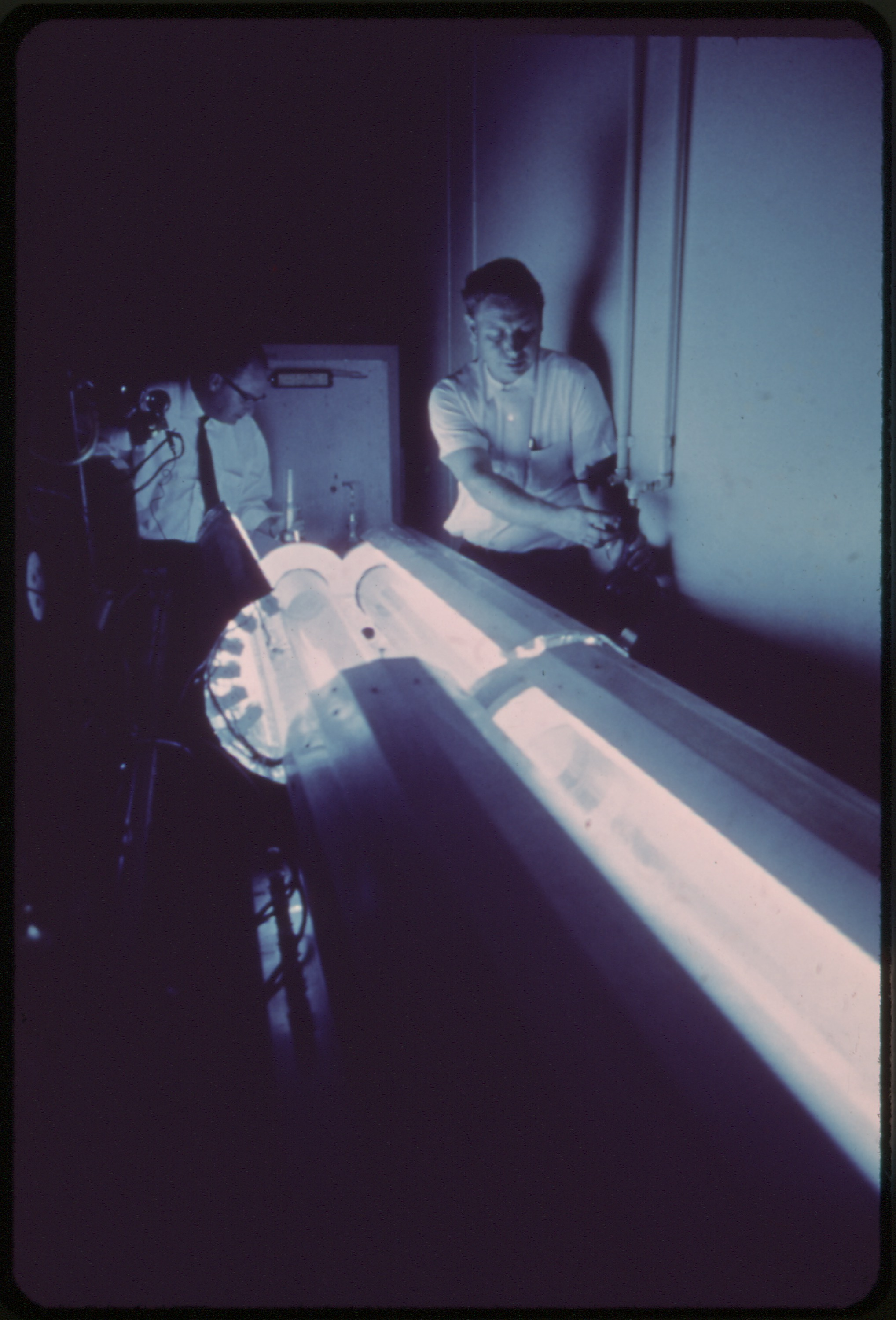
Researchers at the Statewide Air Pollution Research Center manufacture smog using a photochemical tube reactor (May 1972).

==== Atmospheric Modeling and Support Section ====
The Atmospheric Modeling & Support Section is one of three sections within the Modeling & Meteorology Branch. The other two sections are the Regional Air Quality Modeling Section and the Meteorology Section.

The air quality and atmospheric pollution dispersion models routinely used by this Section include a number of the models recommended by the U.S. Environmental Protection Agency (EPA). The section uses models which were either developed by CARB or whose development was funded by CARB, such as:

- CALPUFF – Originally developed by the Sigma Research Company (SRC) under contract to CARB. Currently maintained by the TRC Solution Company under contract to the U.S. EPA.
- CALGRID – Developed by CARB and currently maintained by CARB.
- SARMAP – Developed by CARB and currently maintained by CARB.

== Role in reducing greenhouse gases ==
The California Air Resources Board is charged with implementing California's comprehensive suite of policies to reduce emissions of greenhouse gases. In part due to CARB, California has successfully decoupled greenhouse gas emissions from economic growth, and achieved its goal of reducing emissions to 1990 levels four years earlier than the target date of 2020.

=== Alternative Fuel Vehicle Incentive Program ===
Alternative Fuel Vehicle Incentive Program (also known as Fueling Alternatives) is funded by the California Air Resources Board (CARB), offered throughout the State of California and administered by the California Center for Sustainable Energy (CCSE).

=== Low-Emission Vehicle Program ===
The CARB first adopted the Low-Emission Vehicle (LEV) Program standards in 1990 to address smog-forming pollutants, which covered automobiles sold in California from 1994 through 2003. An amendment to the LEV Program, known as LEV II, was adopted in 1999, and covered vehicles for the 2004 through 2014 model years. Greenhouse gas (GHG) emission regulations were adopted in 2004 starting for the 2009 model year, and are named the "Pavley" standards after Assemblymember Fran Pavley, who had written Assembly Bill 1493 in 2002 to establish them. A second amendment, LEV III, was adopted in 2012, and covers vehicles sold from 2015 onward for both smog (superseding LEV II) and GHG (superseding Pavley) emissions. The rules created under the LEV Program have been codified as specific sections in Title 13 of the California Code of Regulations; in general, LEV I is § 1960.1; LEV II is § 1961; Pavley is § 1961.1; LEV III is § 1961.2 (smog-forming pollutants) and 1961.3 (GHG). The ZEV regulations, which were initially part of LEV I, have been broken out separately into § 1962.

For comparison, the average new car sold in 1965 would produce approximately 2,000 lb (910 kg) of hydrocarbons over 100,000 mi (160,000 km) of driving; under the LEV I standards, the average new car sold in 1998 was projected to produce hydrocarbon emissions of 50 lb (23 kg) over the same distance, and under LEV II, the average new car in 2010 would further reduce hydrocarbon emissions to 10 lb (4.5 kg).

==== Required labeling ====
Global warming and smog scores
| Global warming score | CO_{2} (g/mi) | Smog score | MY (2009) 2013–2017 (Note: Based on the scoring for the "Environmental Performance Label", applied to new vehicles model years 2009–2012 in California. The California label was aligned with Federal standards in 2013.) | | | MY 2018+ (Note: Scoring realigned with LEV III/Tier 3 scores starting in model year 2018. Note the change in standards; for example, a LEV under LEV II (160 mg/mi) which was rated with a smog score of 4 under the old label would now be rated with as LEV160 under LEV III and would receive a smog score of 1.) | | |
| Global warming score | CO_{2} (g/mi) | Smog score | CA LEV II | EPA Tier 2 | NMOG+NO_{x} (g/mi) | CA LEV III | EPA Tier 3 | NMOG+NO_{x} (g/mi) |
|---|---|---|---|---|---|---|---|---|
| 10 | <200 | 10 | ZEV | Bin 1 | 0.000 | ZEV | Bin 0 | 0.000 |
| 9 | 200–239 | 9 | AT PZEV, PZEV | — | 0.030 | — | — | |
| 8 | 240–279 | 8 | SULEV | Bin 2 | 0.030 | SULEV20 | Bin 20 | 0.020 |
| 7 | 280–319 | 7 | — | Bin 3 | 0.085 | SULEV30 | Bin 30 | 0.030 |
| 6 | 320–359 | 6 | — | Bin 4 | 0.110 | ULEV50 | Bin 50 | 0.050 |
| 5 | 360–399 | 5 | ULEV | — | 0.125 | ULEV70 | Bin 70 | 0.070 |
| 4 | 400–439 | 4 | LEV | Bin 5 | 0.160 | — | — | |
| 3 | 440–479 | 3 | — | Bin 6 | 0.190 – 0.200 | ULEV125 | Bin 125 | 0.125 |
| 2 | 480–519 | 2 | — | Bin 7 | 0.240 | — | — | |
| 1 | ≥520 | 1 | — (Note: ULEV under California LEV I standard.) | Bin 8a | 0.325 | LEV160 | Bin 160 | 0.160 |
Notes

In 2005, the California State Assembly passed AB 1229, which required all new vehicles manufactured after January 1, 2009, to bear an Environmental Performance Label, which scored the emissions performance of the vehicle on two scales ranging between 1 (worst) and 10 (best): one for global warming (emissions of GHG such as N_{2}O, CH_{4}, air conditioning refrigerants, and CO_{2}) and one for smog-forming compounds (non-methane organic gases (NMOG), NO_{x}, and HC). The Federal Government followed suit and required a similar "smog score" on new vehicles sold starting in 2013; the standards were realigned for labels applied to 2018 model year vehicles.

==== Vehicle categories ====
The LEV program has established several categories of reduced emissions vehicles. LEV I defined LEV and ULEV vehicles, and added TLEV and Tier 1 temporary classifications that would not be sold after 2003. LEV II added SULEV and PZEV vehicles, and LEV III tightened emission standards. The actual emission levels depend on the standards in use.

- LEV (Low Emission Vehicle): The least stringent emission standard for all new cars sold in California beyond 2004.
- ULEV (Ultra Low Emission Vehicle): 50% cleaner than the average new 2003 model year vehicle.
- SULEV (Super Ultra Low Emission Vehicle): These vehicles emit substantially lower levels of hydrocarbons, carbon monoxide, oxides of nitrogen and particulate matter than conventional vehicles. They are 90% cleaner than the average new 2003 model year vehicle.

LEV I defined emission limits for several different classes of vehicle, including passenger cars (PC), light-duty trucks (LDT), and medium-duty vehicles (MDV). Heavy-duty vehicles were specifically excluded from LEV I. LEV I also defined a loaded vehicle weight (LVW) as the vehicle's Curb weight plus an allowance of 300 lb (140 kg). In general, the most stringent standards were applied to passenger cars and light-duty trucks with a LVW up to 3,750 lb (1,700 kg) (these "light" LDTs were later denoted LDT1 under LEV II). LEV II increased the scope of vehicles classed as light-duty trucks to encompass a higher GVWR up to 8,500 lb (3,900 kg), compared to the LEV I standard of 6,000 lb (2,700 kg). In addition, LEV I had defined less stringent limits for heavier LDTs (denoted LDT2 with a LVW 3,751–5,750 lb (1,701–2,608 kg)); LEV II closed that discrepancy and defined a single emissions standard for all PCs and LDTs. Under LEV III, medium-duty passenger vehicles (MDPV) were brought under the most stringent standards alongside PCs and LDTs.

Vehicle classes under the LEV regulations
| Class | Abbr. | GVWR | Notes |
|---|---|---|---|
| Passenger car | PC | — | Designed primarily for transportation of persons with a design capacity of ≤12 people. |
| Light-duty truck | LDT | ≤6,000 lb 2,700 kg (Note: For model years before 2000) | Designed primarily for transportation of property, derivatives of those, or available with special features for off-street use. LDT1 was defined as those with LVW up to 3,750 lb (1,700 kg), and LDT2 was defined as those with LVW from 3,751 to 5,750 lb (1,701 to 2,608 kg). |
| Light-duty truck | LDT | ≤8,500 lb 3,900 kg (Note: For model years 2000 and subsequent) | Designed primarily for transportation of property, derivatives of those, or available with special features for off-street use. LDT1 was defined as those with LVW up to 3,750 lb (1,700 kg), and LDT2 was defined as those with LVW from 3,751 to 5,750 lb (1,701 to 2,608 kg). |
| Medium-duty vehicle | MDV | ≤8,500 lb 3,900 kg (Note: For model years before 1995) | Any non-passenger vehicle with a GVWR >6,000 lb (2,700 kg) and less than the limits shown here. |
| Medium-duty vehicle | MDV | ≤14,000 lb 6,400 kg (Note: For model years 1995 and subsequent, or model years 1992 and subsequent LEV, ULEV, SULEV, or ZEV.) | Any non-passenger vehicle with a GVWR >6,000 lb (2,700 kg) and less than the limits shown here. |

==== Smog-forming compound emissions limits ====
Rather than providing a single standard for vehicles based on age, purpose, and weight, the LEV I standards introduced different tiers of limits for smog-forming compound emissions starting in the 1995 model year. After 2003, LEV was the minimum standard to be met.

California Emissions Standards (Note: Values are in grams per mile for all passenger cars and those light-duty trucks with a loaded vehicle weight (total of kerb weight plus 300 lb (140 kg) driver) less than 3,750 lb (1,700 kg), tested under the FTP-75 protocol.) (Note: Under LEV II and LEV III, the definition of light duty trucks was expanded to encompass all vehicles with a gross vehicle weight rating of 8,500 lb (3,900 kg) or less.) (Note: Under LEV III, this category also now includes all medium-duty passenger vehicles with a GVWR of 10,000 lb (4,500 kg) or less.)
| Category | | NMOG (Note: Non-methane organic gases)+NO_{x} (Note: NMOG and NO_{x} were reported separately under LEV I and LEV II) | | | CO | | | PM (Note: Particulate Matter) | | | HCHO | | |
| Category | | LEV I (Note: LEV I standards are given for emissions at the 100,000 mi (160,000 km) / 10-year age) | LEV II (Note: LEV II standards are given for emissions at the 120,000 mi (190,000 km) / 11-year age) | LEV III (Note: LEV III standards are given for emissions at the 150,000 mi (240,000 km) age) | LEV I | LEV II | LEV III | LEV I | LEV II | LEV III | LEV I | LEV II | LEV III |
|---|---|---|---|---|---|---|---|---|---|---|---|---|---|
| Tier 1 (Note: Tier 1 and transitional LEV (TLEV) vehicles were not sold after 2003.) | | 0.91 (Note: LEV I: 0.31 g/mi NMOG + 0.6 g/mi NO_{x}.) (Note: LEV I: 0.31 g/mi NMOG + 1.0 g/mi NO_{x} for diesel-powered vehicles.) (Note: For comparison, the values for 1988–94 model year passenger cars, light-duty trucks, and medium-duty trucks (<3,750 LVW) were 0.39–0.46 g/mi NMOG and 0.4-1.0 g/mi NO_{x}.) | — | — | 4.2 (Note: For comparison, the values for 1988–94 model year passenger cars were 7.0-8.3 g/mi CO, and for light-duty trucks and medium-duty trucks (<3,750 LVW), 9.0-10.6 g/mi CO.) | — | — | — | — | — | — (Note: Formaldehyde standards provided for 1993 and newer model year vehicles fueled by methanol and ethanol: for passenger cars, light-duty trucks and medium-duty trucks (<3,750 LVW), 0.023 g/mi HCHO for 1993–95 and 0.015 g/mi HCHO for 1996+) | — | — |
| TLEV | | 0.756 (Note: LEV I: 0.156 g/mi NMOG + 0.6 g/mi NO_{x}) | — | — | 4.2 | — | — | 0.08 | — | — | 0.018 | — | — |
| LEV | LEV160 | 0.390 (Note: LEV I: 0.090 g/mi NMOG + 0.3 g/mi NO_{x}) | 0.160 (Note: LEV II: 0.090 g/mi NMOG + 0.07 g/mi NO_{x}) | 0.160 | 4.2 | 4.2 | 4.2 | 0.08 | 0.01 | 0.01 | 0.018 | 0.018 | 0.004 |
| ULEV | ULEV125 | 0.355 (Note: LEV I: 0.055 g/mi NMOG + 0.3 g/mi NO_{x}) | 0.125 (Note: LEV II: 0.055 g/mi NMOG + 0.07 g/mi NO_{x}) | 0.125 | 2.1 | 2.1 | 2.1 | 0.04 | 0.01 | 0.01 | 0.011 | 0.011 | 0.004 |
| ULEV | ULEV70 | 0.355 | 0.125 | 0.070 | 2.1 | 2.1 | 1.7 | 0.04 | 0.01 | 0.01 | 0.011 | 0.011 | 0.004 |
| ULEV | ULEV50 | 0.355 | 0.125 | 0.050 | 2.1 | 2.1 | 1.7 | 0.04 | 0.01 | 0.01 | 0.011 | 0.011 | 0.004 |
| SULEV (Note: SULEV for passenger cars and light-duty trucks was not defined until LEV II.) | SULEV30 | — | 0.030 (Note: LEV II: 0.010 g/mi NMOG + 0.02 g/mi NO_{x}) | 0.030 | — | 1.0 | 1.0 | — | 0.01 | 0.01 | — | 0.004 | 0.004 |
| SULEV | SULEV20 | — | 0.030 | 0.020 | — | 1.0 | 1.0 | — | 0.01 | 0.01 | — | 0.004 | 0.004 |

==== Greenhouse gas emissions limits ====
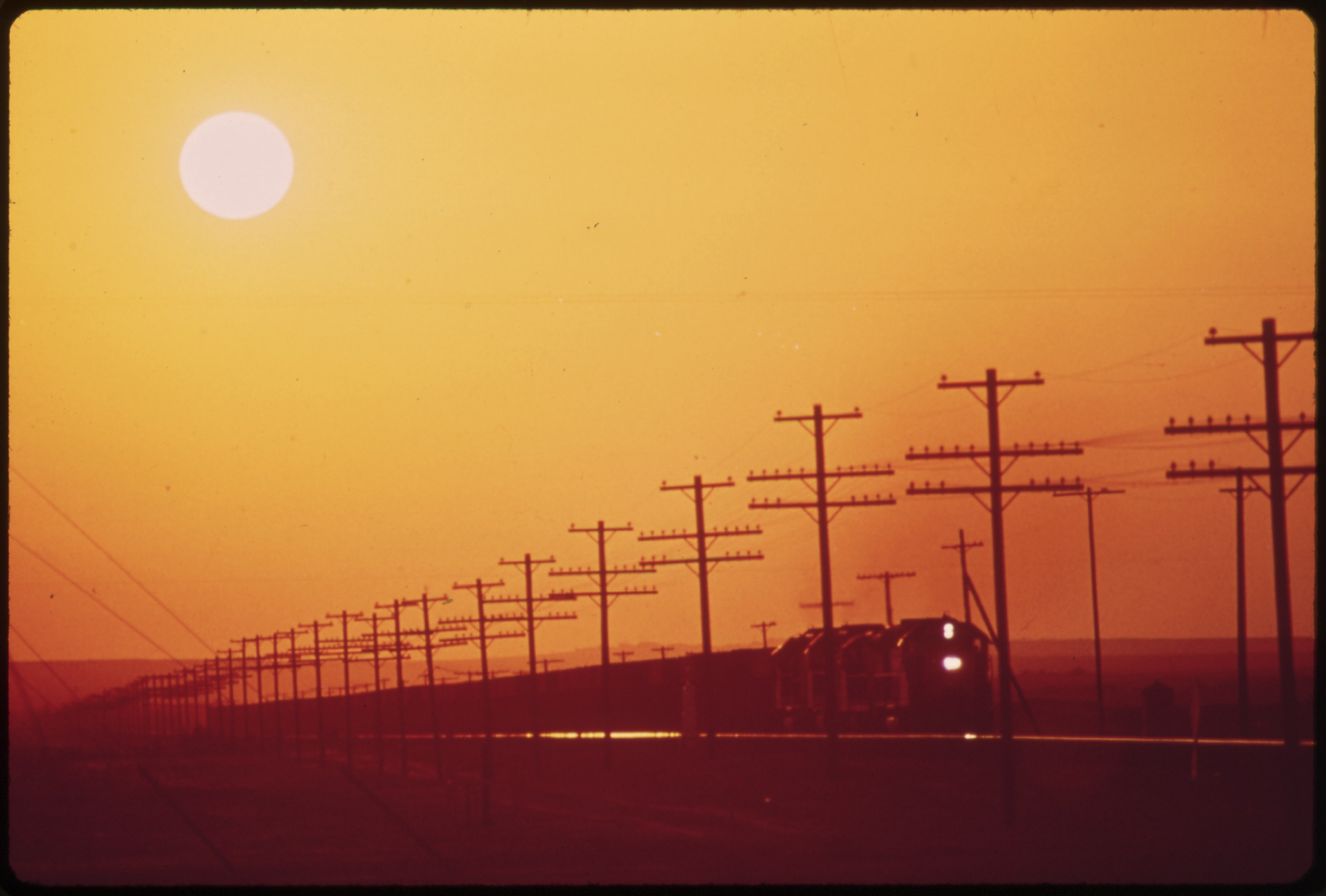
Sunlight filtered through smog near Blythe, May 1972

CARB adopted regulations for limits on greenhouse gas emissions in 2004 starting with the 2009 model year to support the direction provided by AB 1493. In June 2005, Governor Arnold Schwarzenegger signed Executive Order S-03-05, which required a reduction in California GHG emissions, targeting an 80% reduction compared to 1990 levels by 2050. Assembly Bill 32, better known as the California Global Warming Solutions Act of 2006, codified these requirements.

CARB filed a waiver request with the United States Environmental Protection Agency (EPA) under Section 209(b) of the Clean Air Act in December 2005 to permit it to establish limits on greenhouse gas emissions; although the waiver request was initially denied in March 2008, it was later approved on June 30, 2009, after President Barack Obama signed a Presidential Memorandum directing the EPA to reconsider the waiver. In the initial denial, EPA Administrator Stephen L. Johnson stated the Clean Air Act was not "intended to allow California to promulgate state standards for emissions from new motor vehicles designed to address global climate change problems" and further, that he did not believe "the effects of climate change in California are compelling and extraordinary compared to the effects in the rest of the country." Johnson's successor, Lisa P. Jackson, signed the waiver overturning Johnson's denial, writing that "EPA must grant California a waiver if California determines that its standards are, in the aggregate, at least as protective of the public health and welfare as applicable Federal standards." Jackson also noted that in the history of the waiver process, over 50 waivers had been granted and only one had been fully denied, namely the March 2008 denial of the GHG emissions regulation.

Greenhouse gas fleet average emissions targets
| Model Year | (g/mi CO_{2}-equivalent) | |
| Model Year | PCs & LDT1s | LDT2s & MDPVs |
|---|---|---|
| 2009 | 323 | 439 |
| 2010 | 301 | 420 |
| 2011 | 267 | 390 |
| 2012 | 233 | 361 |
| 2013 | 227 | 355 |
| 2014 | 222 | 350 |
| 2015 | 213 | 341 |
| 2016+ | 205 | 332 |

CARB decided to adopt regulation of GHG emissions under Executive Order G-05-061, which provided phase-in targets for fleet average GHG emissions in CO_{2}-equivalent grams per mile starting with the 2009 model year. The calculation of CO_{2}-equivalent emissions was based on contributions from four different chemicals: CO_{2}, N_{2}O, CH_{4}, and air conditioning refrigerants.

The emissions in g/mi CO_{2}-equivalent are calculated according to the formula $CO_2^\mathrm{equivalent} = CO_2 + 296\times N_2O + 23\times CH_4 - AC^\mathrm{direct} - AC^\mathrm{indirect}$, which has two terms for direct and indirect emissions allowances of air conditioning refrigerants, depending on the refrigerant used, such as HFC134a, and the system design. Vehicles powered by alternative fuels use a slightly modified formula, $CO_2^\mathrm{equivalent} = (CO_2 + AC^\mathrm{indirect})\times F + 296\times N_2O + 23\times CH_4 + AC^\mathrm{direct}$, where $F$ is a fuel adjustment factor depending on the alternative fuel used (1.03 for natural gas, 0.89 for LPG, and 0.74 for E85). ZEVs are also required to calculate GHG as the processes to generate the energy (or fuel) used also produce GHG. For ZEVs, $CO_2^\mathrm{equivalent} = U + AC^\mathrm{direct}$, where $U$ is the upstream emissions factor (130 g/mi for battery electric vehicles, 210 for hydrogen/fuel cell, and 290 for hydrogen/internal combustion). Direct CO_{2} emissions could be calculated in a relatively straightforward fashion based on fuel consumption. Manufacturers that do not wish to measure N_{2}O emissions may assume a value of 0.006 g/mi. An update was issued in 2010 which allowed manufacturers to calculate GHG emissions using CAFE data; for conventionally powered vehicles, the contribution from the nitrous oxide and methane terms could be assumed to be 1.9 g/mi.

CARB voted unanimously in March 2017 to require automakers to average 54.5 miles per US gallon (4.32 L/100 km; 65.5 mpg_{‑imp}) for new cars in 2025.

==== Section 177 states ====
Section 177 states: • blue=LEV only • green=LEV+ZEV • red=LEV repealed

"California emissions" states
| State | LEV | ZEV | MY |
|---|---|---|---|
| CA | Yes | Yes | 2005 |
| CO | Yes | Yes | 2022 |
| CT | Yes | Yes | 2008 |
| DC | Yes | No | 2012 |
| DE | Yes | No | 2014 |
| MA | Yes | Yes | 2009 |
| MD | Yes | Yes | 2011 |
| ME | Yes | Yes | 2009 |
| MN | Yes | Yes | 2025 (anticipated) |
| NJ | Yes | Yes | 2009 |
| NM | Yes | Yes | 2026 |
| NV | Yes | Yes | 2025 |
| NY | Yes | Yes | 2009 |
| OR | Yes | Yes | 2009 |
| PA | Yes | No | 2008 |
| RI | Yes | Yes | 2009 |
| VA | Yes | Yes | 2025 |
| VT | Yes | Yes | 2009 |
| WA | Yes | Yes | 2009 (ZEV: 2025) |

Because California had emissions regulations prior to the 1977 Clean Air Act, under Section 177 of that bill, other states may adopt the more stringent California emissions regulations as an alternative to federal standards. Thirteen other states and the District of Columbia have chosen to do so, and ten of those have additionally adopted the California Zero-Emission Vehicle regulations. In December 2020, Minnesota announced its intention to adopt California LEV and ZEV rules; following a hearing before an administrative law judge in February 2021, the Minnesota Pollution Control Agency adopted the California regulations. In August 2022, Virginia, citing to a 2021 law, announced it would follow California regulations for ZEV registrations.

Arizona and New Mexico had previously adopted California LEV regulations under Section 177, but later repealed those states' clean car standards in 2012 and 2013, respectively.

In Canada, the province of Quebec adopted CARB standards effective in 2010. CARB and the Government of Canada entered into a Memorandum of Understanding in June 2019 to cooperate on greenhouse gas emissions mitigation.

=== Zero-Emission Vehicle Program ===
The CARB Zero-Emission Vehicle (ZEV) program was enacted by the California government starting in 1990 to promote the use of zero emission vehicles. The program goal is to reduce the pervasive air pollution affecting the main metropolitan areas in the state, particularly in Los Angeles, where prolonged pollution episodes are frequent. The California ZEV rule was first adopted by CARB as part of the 1990 Low-Emission Vehicle (LEV I) Program. The focus of the 1990 rules (ZEV-90) was to meet air quality standards for ozone rather than the reduction of greenhouse gas (GHG) emissions.

Under LEV II in 1999, the ZEV regulations were moved to a separate section (13 CCR § 1962) and the requirements for ZEVs as a percentage of fleet sales was made more formal. Executive Order S-03-05 (2005) and Assembly Bills 1493 (2002) and 32 (2006) prompted CARB to reevaluate the ZEV program as last amended in 1996, which had been primarily concerned with reducing emissions of smog-forming pollutants. By the time AB 32 passed in 2006, vehicles complying with PZEV and AT PZEV standards had become commercially successful, and the ZEV program could then shift towards reducing both smog-forming compounds and greenhouse gases.

The next set of ZEV regulations were adopted in 2012 with LEV III. CARB put both LEV and ZEV rules together as the Advanced Clean Cars Program (ACC), adopted in 2012, which included regulations for cars sold through the 2025 model year. The regulations include updates to regulations for LEV III (for smog-forming emissions), LEV III GHG (for greenhouse gas emissions), and ZEV. Since then, in September 2020 Governor Gavin Newsom signed an executive order directing that by 2035, all new cars and passenger trucks sold in California will be zero-emission vehicles. Executive Order N-79-20 directs CARB to develop regulations to require that ZEVs be an increasing share of new vehicles sold in the state, with light-duty cars and trucks and off-road vehicles and equipment meeting the 100% ZEV goal by 2035 and medium and heavy-duty trucks and buses meeting the same 100% ZEV goal by 2045. The order also directs Caltrans to develop near-term actions to encourage "an integrated, statewide rail and transit network" and infrastructure to support bicycles and pedestrians. In response, CARB began development of the Advanced Clean Cars II (ACC II) Program, focusing on emissions of vehicles sold after 2025. ACC II reiterated the aim to have all new passenger cars, trucks and SUVs sold in the state to be zero emissions vehicles by 2035, and was scheduled for consideration before CARB in June 2022. The regulations of ACC II were adopted by California in August 2022.

==== Vehicle definitions ====
LEV I defined a ZEV as one that produces "zero emissions of any criteria pollutants under any and all possible operational modes and conditions." A vehicle could still qualify as a ZEV with a fuel-fired heater, as long as the heater was unable to be operated at ambient temperatures above 40 °F (4 °C) and did not have any evaporative emissions. Under LEV II (ZEV-99), the ZEV definition was updated to include precursor pollutants, but did not consider upstream emissions from power plants.

The ZEV regulation has evolved and been modified several times since 1990, and several new partial or low-emission categories were created and defined, including the introduction of PZEV and AT PZEV categories in ZEV-99.

- PZEV (Partial Zero Emission Vehicle): Meets SULEV tailpipe standards, has a 15-year / 150,000-mile warranty, and zero evaporative emissions. These vehicles are 80% cleaner than the average 2002 model year car.
- AT PZEV (Advanced Technology PZEV): These are advanced technology vehicles that meet PZEV standards and include ZEV enabling technology, typically hybrid electric vehicles (HEV). They are 80% cleaner than the average 2002 model year car.
- ZEV (Zero Emission Vehicle): Zero tailpipe emissions, and 98% cleaner than the average new 2003 model year vehicle.

==== Manufacturer sales volume ====
Under ZEV-90, CARB classified manufacturers according to the average sales per year between 1989 and 1993; small volume manufacturers were those that sold 3,000 or fewer new vehicles per year; intermediate volume manufacturers sold between 3,001 and 35,000; and large volume manufacturers sold more than 35,000 per year. For large volume manufacturers, CARB required that 2% of 1998 to 2000 model year vehicles sold were ZEVs, ramping up to 5% ZEVs by 2001 and 10% ZEVs in 2003 and beyond. Intermediate volume manufacturers were not required to meet the goals until 2003, and small volume manufacturers were exempted. These percentages were calculated based on total production of passenger cars and light-duty trucks with a loaded vehicle weight (LVW) less than 3,750 lb (1,700 kg).

==== ZEV credit system ====
ZEV-96 credits
| Model Year | 2 ZEV Count | | 3 ZEV Count | |
| Model Year | Range (mi) | Specific Energy (Wh/kg) | Range (mi) | Specific Energy (Wh/kg) |
|---|---|---|---|---|
| 1996–97 | any | any | ≥70 | ≥40 |
| 1998 | ≥100 | any | ≥130 | ≥40 |
| 1999 | ≥100 | ≥50 | ≥130 | ≥60 |
| 2000 | ≥140 | ≥50 | ≥175 | ≥60 |
| 2001–02 | ≥140 | ≥60 | ≥175 | ≥90 |

The LEV I rules also introduced the concept of emission credits. Under LEV I, the vehicle fleet average emissions rate of non-methane organic gases (NMOG) produced by a manufacturer was required to meet increasingly stringent requirements starting in 1994. The calculation of fleet average NMOG emissions was based on a weighted sum of vehicle NMOG emissions, based on the number sold and type of certification (i.e., TLEV, LEV, ULEV, etc.), divided by the total number of vehicles produced, including ZEVs. Manufacturers whose fleet average NMOG emissions met or exceeded the NMOG emissions goal would be subjected to civil penalties; those which fell below the goal would receive credits, which could then be marketed to other manufacturers.

The 1996 amendments to the ZEV regulations in LEV I (ZEV-96) introduced credits where a ZEV could be counted more than once based on vehicle range or battery specific energy to encourage deployment of ZEVs prior to 2003.

Under LEV II/ZEV-99, the PZEV and AT PZEV categories were introduced, and the percentage of ZEVs sold by a manufacturer could be partially met by the sales of PZEV and AT PZEVs. If a vehicle met PZEV criteria, it qualified for a credit equal to 0.2 of one ZEV for the purposes of calculating that manufacturer's ZEV production. AT PZEVs capable of traveling with zero emissions for a limited range were allowed additional credit if the urban all-electric range was at least ten miles. ZEVs that were introduced prior to 2003 received a multiplier, with a value ranging up to 10× a single ZEV depending on the all-electric range and fast-charging capability.

==== MOA demonstration fleet ====
MOA EVs (1997+)
| Mfr | Model | Date | Battery | Range | Qty (Dec. 97) |
|---|---|---|---|---|---|
| Chrysler | EPIC | ?/97 | SLA | 60 mi 97 km | 17 |
| Ford | Ranger EV | ?/97 | SLA | 60 mi 97 km | 10 |
| GM | EV1 | 12/96 | SLA | 75 mi 121 km | 265 |
| GM | S-10 EV | ?/97 | SLA | 40 mi 64 km | 354 |
| GM | S-10 EV | ?/97 | NiMH | 80 mi 130 km | 7 |
| Honda | EV Plus | 05/97 | NiMH | 125 mi 201 km | 104 |
| Nissan | Altra | ?/98 | Li-ion | 120 mi 190 km | — |
| Toyota | RAV4 EV | 10/97 | NiMH | 125 mi 201 km | 69 |

In March 1996, ZEV-96 eliminated the ZEV ramp-up planned to start in 1998, but the goal of 10% ZEVs by 2003 was retained, with credits granted for sales of partial ZEVs (PZEVs). According to comment responses, CARB determined that advanced batteries would not be ready in time to meet the ZEV requirements until at least 2003.

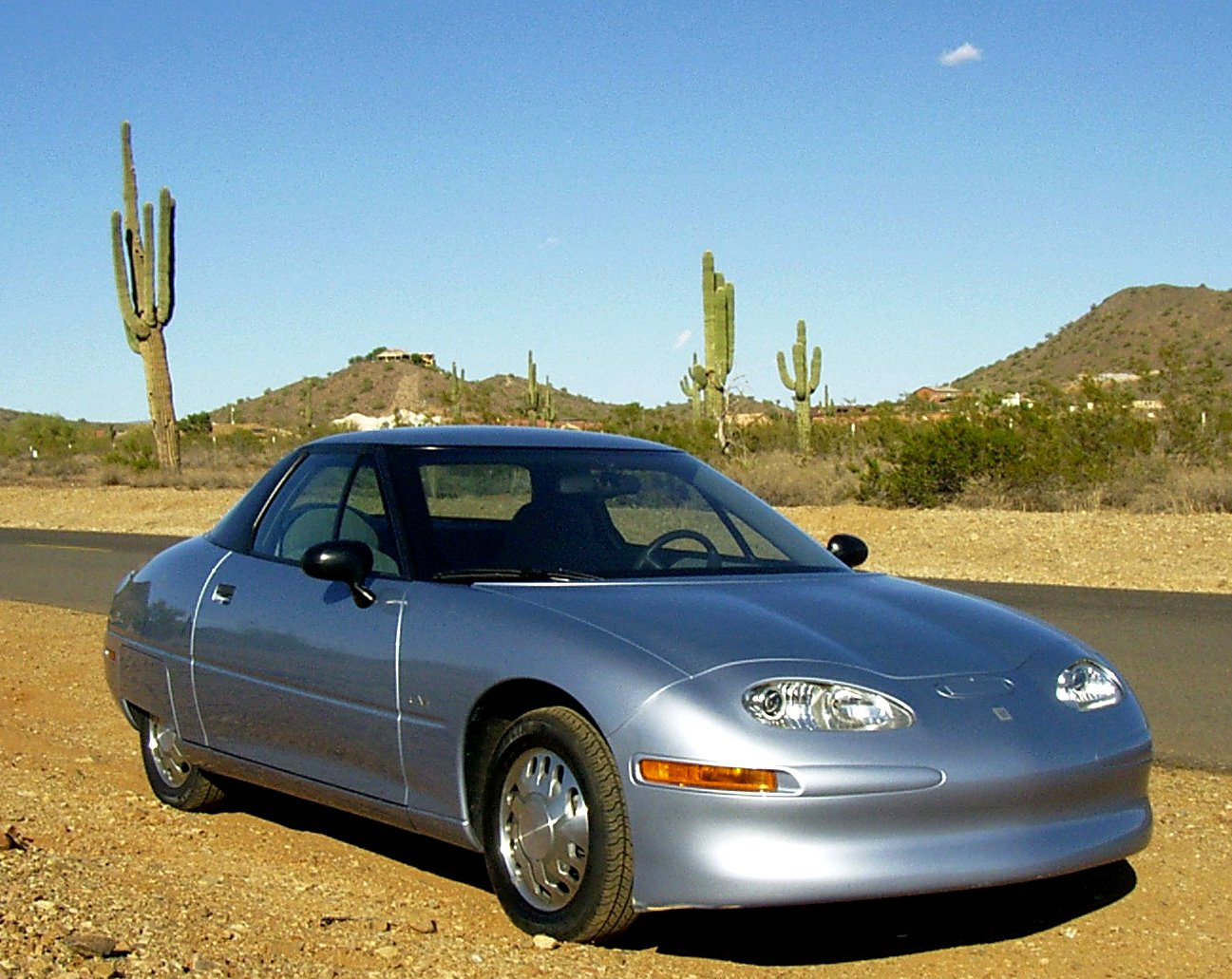
GM EV1

In conjunction with relaxing the requirements in ZEV-96, CARB signed memoranda of agreement (MOAs) with the seven large scale manufacturers to begin rolling out demonstration fleets of ZEVs with limited public availability in the near term. The GM EV1 was the first battery electric vehicle (BEV) offered to the public, in partial fulfillment of the agreement with CARB. The EV1 was available only through a US$399 (equivalent to $820 in 2025)/month lease starting in December 1996; the initial markets were South Coast, San Diego, and Arizona, and expanded to Sacramento and the Bay Area. GM also offered an electric S-10 pickup truck to fleet operators.

In 1997, Honda (EV Plus, May 1997), Toyota (RAV4 EV, October 1997), and Chrysler (EPIC, 1997) followed suit. Ford also introduced the Ranger EV for the 1998 model year, and Nissan stated they planned to offer the Altra in the 1998 model year as well to fulfill the MOA. As an acceptable alternative, Mazda stated they would purchase ZEV credits from Ford.

==== Advanced Clean Cars ====
The Low-Emission Vehicle Program was revised to define modified ZEV regulations for 2015 models. CARB estimates that ACC will result in 10% of all sales to be ZEVs by 2025. The share remained at 3% between 2014 and 2016. Battery vehicles receive 3 or 4 credits, while fuel cell cars receive 9. As of 2016, a credit has a market value of $3–4,000, and some automakers have more credits than required.

CARB held a public workshop in September 2020 where several new consumer-friendly regulations for ZEVs were proposed to improve adoption:

- Standardization of a DC Fast Charge inlet (proposing to use CCS Combo 1, with adapters provided by the vehicle manufacturer if applicable)
- Standardization of vehicle and battery data (to assist assessment of need for repairs/condition)
- Implement a standardized battery state-of-health (SOH) indicator (using SAE J1634 dynamometer testing to define battery capacity) and define a value of battery SOH that qualifies for warranty repair
- Make ZEV powertrain service and repair information available to independent technicians and repair shops (including standardization of communication protocols for vehicle data)

In May 2021, additional draft requirements were added:

- Durability: BEVs to maintain 80% of certified range for 15 years/150,000 miles
- Durability: FCEVs to maintain 90% of fuel cell system output power after 4,000 hours of operation
- Battery Labelling: standardized content to improve the efficiency of recycling batteries to recover materials or potential repurposing

To improve access to ZEVs, CARB added proposed environmental justice (EJ) credits in August 2021 for manufacturers who improve options for clean transportation to underserved communities, such as by providing a discount on a ZEV that would be used in a community-based clean mobility program. The August workshop also included additional regulations for ZEVs:

- Range: starting in 2026, minimum (2-cycle) range to be 200 mi (320 km)
- On-board charger: minimum 5.76 kW for AC (Level 2) charging, sufficient for a BEV to charge overnight (8 hours) from a 30A source
View source data.
Stringency proposal

The final workshop in October 2021 proposed that ZEVs would be taken out of fleet calculations for vehicle emissions and provided yearly targets for ZEV vehicle sales as a percent of total sales, including potential EJ credits. Additionally, the required warranty period and requirements to take credit for PHEV sales were defined:

- Battery to retain ≥ 80% SoH for 8 years/100,000 miles
- PHEVs to meet one of two requirements:
  - Transitional PHEVs (2026–28): minimum 30 mi (48 km) all-electric range with additional credit if vehicle exceeds 10 mi (16 km) on the US06 high speed/acceleration cycle; 8-year/100,000 80%SOH battery warranty, 5.76 kW on-board charger
  - Full credit PHEVs (2026+): minimum 50 mi (80 km) all-electric range, minimum 40 mi (64 km) on the US06 high speed/acceleration cycle; 8-year/100,000 80%SOH battery warranty, 5.76 kW on-board charger
- "Small volume" manufacturers (defined as those selling fewer than 4,500 cars per year) are required to comply with the ZEV mandate starting with the 2035 model year

=== OHV Emission Standards ===
The California DMV implements the policy dictates of the California Air Resources Board (CARB) with respect to registration of off-highway motor vehicles (OHVs). Registration consists of ID plates or placards issued by the DMV. Operating a motorized vehicle off-highway in California requires either a Green Sticker or a Red Sticker ID. The Green Sticker indicates that the vehicle has passed emission requirements. The Red Sticker (issued through 2021) restricts OHV use due to not meeting emission standards established by the CARB. The red sticker program began in 1994 when CARB adopted standards for emissions from two-stroke engines used primarily on dirt bikes. Between 1998 and 2003, the red sticker program was refined allowing vehicles that did not meet peak ozone season standards to be operated only at specific times of the year. As of model year 2022, the CARB no longer authorizes issuing of red stickers.

=== Commercial Harbor Craft Regulation ===
The California Air Resources Board's (CARB) Commercial Harbor Craft regulation is a regulatory framework aimed at reducing emissions from commercial vessels operating in California's harbors and ports. The rule primarily targets diesel-powered vessels such as ferries, tugboats, and other workboats that operate in and around California's ports. Since the original adoption of regulation in 2008, and its amendments in 2010 and 2022, vessel owners in the state have been required to either replace their engines or send their boats out of the state.

=== Low-carbon fuel standard ===
The Low-Carbon Fuel Standard (LCFS) requires oil refineries and distributors to ensure that the mix of fuel they sell in the Californian market meets the established declining targets for greenhouse gas emissions measured in CO_{2}-equivalent grams per unit of fuel energy sold for transport purposes. The 2007 Governor's LCFS directive calls for a reduction of at least 10% in the carbon intensity of California's transportation fuels by 2020. These reductions include not only tailpipe emissions but also all other associated emissions from production, distribution and use of transport fuels within the state. Therefore, California LCFS considers the fuel's full life cycle, also known as the "well to wheels" or "seed to wheels" efficiency of transport fuels. The standard is aimed to reduce the state's dependence on petroleum, create a market for clean transportation technology, and stimulate the production and use of alternative, low-carbon fuels in California.

On April 23, 2009, CARB approved the specific rules for the LCFS that will go into effect in January 2011. The rule proposal prepared by its technical staff was approved by a 9–1 vote, to set the 2020 maximum carbon intensity reference value to 86 grams of carbon dioxide released per megajoule of energy produced.

=== PHEV Research Center ===
The PHEV Research Center was launched with funding from the California Air Resources Board.

=== Innovative Clean Transit ===
Under the Innovative Clean Transit (formerly known as the Advanced Clean Transit) regulation adopted in December 2018, public transportation agencies in California will gradually transition to a zero-emission bus fleet by 2040. Large transit agencies (defined as those operating more than 65 buses in the San Joaquin Valley Air Basin or South Coast Air Quality Management District, or those operating more than 100 buses elsewhere with populations greater than 200,000) are required to have 25% of new bus purchases as zero-emission buses (ZEBs) starting in 2023, 50% of new purchases as ZEBs starting in 2026, and 100% of new purchases as ZEBs starting in 2029. Small transit agencies are required to make 25% of new purchases as ZEBs in 2026 and 100% of new purchases as ZEBs in 2029+. Per the regulation, ZEBs are defined to include battery electric buses and fuel cell buses, but do not include electric trolleybuses which draw power from overhead lines. The Antelope Valley Transit Authority has set a goal to be the first all-electric fleet by the end of 2018, ahead of the tightened regulations.

== Regulation of ozone produced by air cleaners and ionizers ==
The California Air Resources Board has a page listing air cleaners (many with ionizers) meeting their indoor ozone limit of 0.050 parts per million. From that article:

All portable indoor air cleaning devices sold in California must be certified by the California Air Resources Board (CARB). To be certified, air cleaners must be tested for electrical safety and ozone emissions, and meet an ozone emission concentration limit of 0.050 parts per million. For more information about the regulation, visit the air cleaner regulation.

== Southern California headquarters, Mary D. Nichols Campus ==
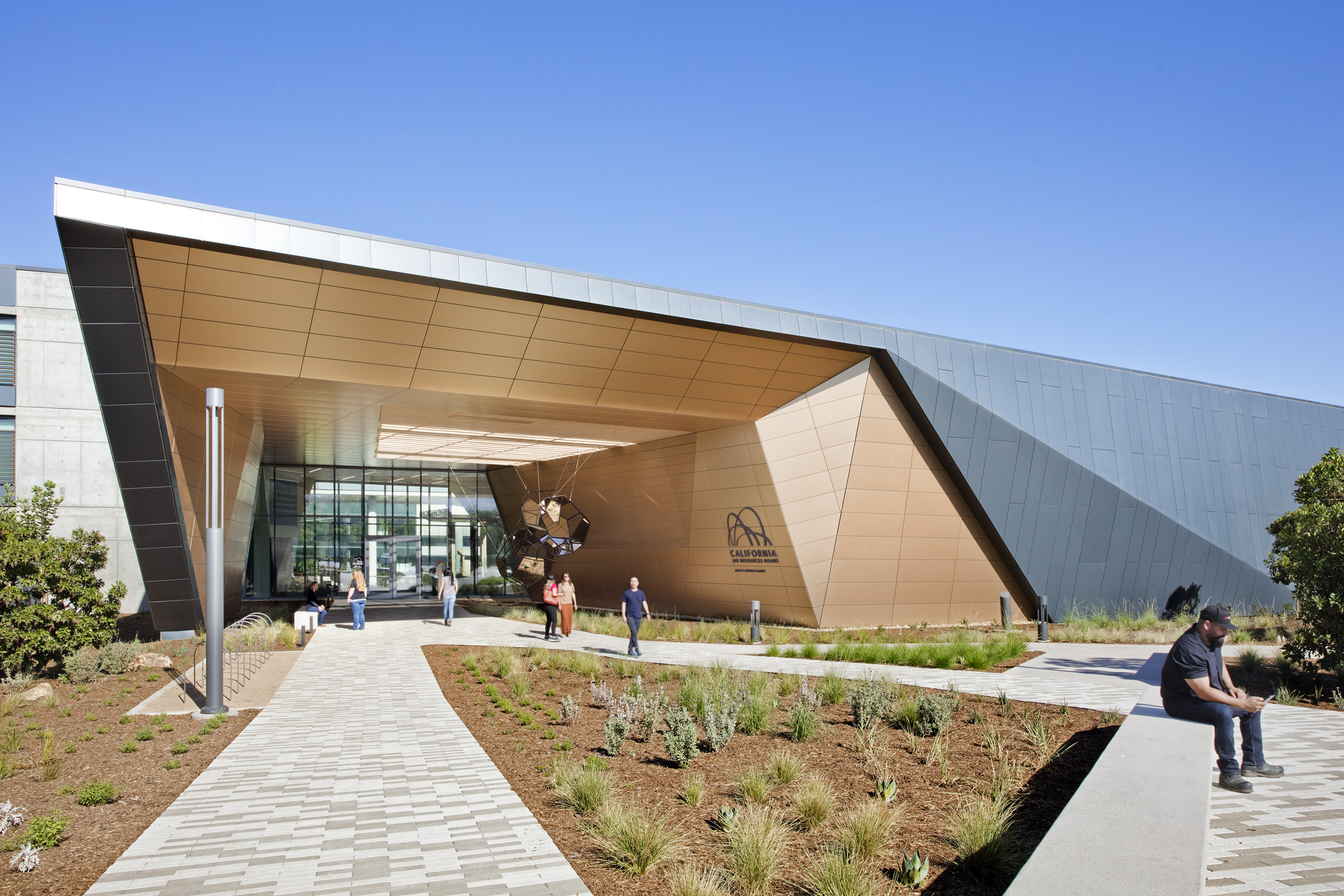
California Air Resources Board's Southern California headquarters in Riverside, California

On October 27, 2017, CARB broke ground on its current Southern California headquarters. CARB chose the site near the University of California, Riverside, in March 2016 and completed environmental studies in June 2017. Construction costs of $419 million, which include $108 million for specialized laboratory and testing equipment, were approved by the Legislature in July. Of those costs, $154 million comes from fines paid by Volkswagen for air quality violations related to the diesel car cheating case. Additional funds will come from the Motor Vehicle Account, the Air Pollution Control Fund and the Vehicle Inspection Repair Fund.

Over a decade of planning went into the development of a replacement for CARB's old Haagen-Smit Laboratory. Opened in 1973 in El Monte, California, the Haagen-Smit Laboratory was the site of many of CARB's efforts to reduce the emissions of cars and trucks, as well as efforts to introduce zero-emission and plug-in vehicles to California. In 2015, engineers and technicians based at the Haagen-Smit Laboratory were instrumental in discovering the infamous VW diesel "defeat device", leading to the largest emissions control violation settlement in national and California history.

The new campus features an extended range of dedicated test cells, including heavy-duty testing. There is also workspace for accommodating new test methods for future generations of vehicles, and space for developing enhanced on-board diagnostics and portable emissions measurement systems. The facility also includes a separate advanced chemistry laboratory. The Southern California Headquarters’ office and administration space accommodates 460 employees and includes visitor reception and public areas, a press room, flexible conference and workshop space, and a 250-person public auditorium.

The office was designed by ZGF Architects and built by Hensel Phelps. At 402,000 square feet, it is the largest Zero Net Energy building in the United States, with solar arrays throughout the campus that generate 3.5 Megawatts of electricity, and a chilled beam temperature management system increasing energy efficiency. As a result, the facility earned Leadership in Energy and Environmental Design (LEED) Platinum certification, and California Green Building Standards Code (CALGreen) Tier 2 standards and is designed to achieve net-zero emissions.

On November 18, 2021, CARB dedicated the new Southern California headquarters in honor of former Chair Mary D. Nichols.

== See also ==
California Air Resources Board

- List of California Air Districts
- 2008 California Statewide Truck and Bus Rule
- Carl Moyer Memorial Air Quality Standards Attainment Program
- California Smog Check Program

Other

- Bioenergy Action Plan
- California Center for Sustainable Energy
- California Code of Regulations
- California Energy Commission
- California Environmental Protection Agency
- California Public Utilities Commission
- Carl Moyer Program
- Ecology of California
- Emission standards
- Emissions trading
- Greenhouse gas emissions by the United States
- Million Solar Roofs (SB 1)
- Plug-in hybrids in California
- Pollution in California
- Regional Greenhouse Gas Initiative
- Spare the Air program
- Texas Low Emission Diesel standards
- Timeline of major US environmental and occupational health regulation
- Upstream emission factor
- US Emission standard
- Vehicle acronyms and abbreviations
- Who Killed the Electric Car?
- Zero-emissions vehicle
