= Carl Moyer Memorial Air Quality Standards Attainment Program =

California engine retrofit and replacement program

The Carl Moyer Memorial Air Quality Standards Attainment Program (Carl Moyer Program) is a State of California engine retrofit and replacement program implemented through the cooperative efforts of local air districts such as the Bay Area Air Quality Management District (BAAQMD) and the California Air Resources Board (ARB). The BAAQMD's Carl Moyer Program is managed by the Air District's Strategic Incentives Division (SID). The program provides grant funding to encourage the voluntary purchase of cleaner-than-required engines, equipment, and emission reduction technologies in an effort to rapidly reduce air pollution. While regulations continue to be the primary means to reduce air pollution emissions, the Carl Moyer Program plays a complementary role to California’s regulatory program by funding emission reductions that are surplus, that is, early and/or in excess of what is required by regulation.

== Objectives ==
The Bay Area Air Quality Management District (BAAQMD) utilizes the Carl Moyer Program to reduce air pollution, especially criteria air pollutants such as airborne particulate matter, ozone, carbon monoxide, nitrogen oxides, sulfur dioxide and lead, in impacted communities in the San Francisco Bay Area. The program provides financial incentives for equipment and vehicle owners to replace or retrofit high polluting engines and equipment. Highly impacted communities are generally economically disadvantaged residential areas located close to industrialized areas with large populations of young children and the elderly. Residents of communities highly impacted by pollution are at higher risk of pollution-related health problems. As an added benefit, the program stimulates the local economy by providing more jobs for engine repair shops and helps businesses by offering incentives for maintenance they would have to implement eventually.

== Administration ==
The ARB annually allocates funds to participating local air districts who implement the program for that program cycle (CMP Year). The Bay Area Air Quality Management District's Strategic Incentives Division administers the program in the San Francisco Bay Area.

== Program results ==
The BAAQMD has funded emission reduction projects through the Carl Moyer Program for 11 years and is entering into Year 12 in spring of 2010. In 2008, the Air District upgraded 360 heavy-duty diesel engines, with 90% of funds awarded to projects in San Francisco Bay Area impacted communities. Estimated lifetime emissions reduction for the projects funded were 113 tons of reactive organic gases (ROG), 1,133 tons of nitrogen oxide (NO), and 45 tons of particulate matter (PM) for a total reduction of 1,291 tons. In 2007, the Air District upgraded 300 heavy-duty diesel engines, with 67% of funds awarded to projects in San Francisco Bay Area impacted communities. Estimated lifetime emissions reduction for the projects funded were 1,225 tons of reactive organic gases (ROG), 9,700 tons of nitrogen oxide (NO), and 410 tons of particulate matter (PM) for a total reduction of 11,335 tons.

On a state level, over its first six years, the Carl Moyer Program cleaned up approximately 6,300 engines, reduced nitrogen oxide emissions by over 18 tons per day, and reduced particulate matter emissions by one ton per day. During this same period it is estimated that the program helped to reduce lost workdays by 17,000 and prevented 2,800 asthma attacks and 100 premature deaths. These and other avoided health and welfare impacts have an estimated mean economic valuation of $790 million.

== The grant process ==
The Bay Area Air Quality Management District awards Carl Moyer Program funds on a first-come, first-served basis to applicants with completed applications. Projects over $100,000 go to the Air District’s Mobile Source Committee for approval, while projects under $100,000 are approved by an Air Pollution Control Officer. Projects are weighted based on emissions reductions.

Once the applicant is awarded funding, they must take part in a pre-project inspection. All existing engines funded must be in working condition at the time of the award. Once the inspection is complete, Strategic Incentives Division staff sends the applicant the grant agreement for review and signature. When fully executed, the grantee can order the engine or equipment and the project can begin.

== Eligible projects ==
The Bay Area Air Quality Management District’s Carl Moyer Program provides grants to public and private entities to reduce emissions of nitrogen oxides, reactive organic gases and particulate matter from existing heavy-duty engines by repowering, retrofitting, or replacing them. The Carl Moyer Program can be used for engine repower and retrofit projects and components of the program such as the Off-Road Equipment Replacement Program (ERP) and the Voucher Incentive Program (VIP) can be used for equipment replacement projects.

Engine repowering is when an existing engine is replaced with a new one. The time it takes to repower an engine varies depending on the size and application of the engine. An engine retrofit is when new components, such as catalysts or filters, are added to an existing engine. Engine retrofits typically take a few hours, after which the engine can immediately be put to use. Equipment Replacement projects consist of replacing the entire unit (chassis and engine) with a new, cleaner piece of equipment.

The Carl Moyer Program provides funding to five categories of heavy-duty diesel engines:

1. Agricultural Vehicles and Equipment - Project examples: repower and or retrofit irrigation pumps.
2. Locomotives - Project examples: alternative switchers, idle limiting device, remanufactured engines, and repower and/or retrofit.
3. Marine Vehicles and Equipment - Project examples: repower and/or retrofit commercial vessels, new vessel purchase and cold ironing oceangoing vessels.
4. Off-road Vehicles and Equipment - Project examples: repower, retrofit and replace tractors and other agricultural equipment, construction equipment, airport ground support equipment, forklifts.
5. On-road Vehicles and Equipment - Project examples: repower, retrofit or replace heavy-duty trucks, and buses.

There are three forms of funding an applicant may receive under the Carl Moyer Program:

1. Up to 100% of the retrofit costs—including installation (installing particle traps or diesel oxidation catalysts)
2. Up to 85% of repower costs, including installation. Repowering is the replacement of the in-use engine with a new engine.
3. Up to 25% of new vehicle or equipment purchases that are cleaner than the law requires
4. Up to 85% of the new equipment (Off-Road category only)
5. Up to $45,000 for a new heavy duty diesel truck On-Road Voucher Incentive Program

== Budget ==
The Bay Area Air Quality Management District receives funding from the California Air Resources Board each fiscal year to implement the Carl Moyer Program. In the Carl Moyer Program’s first seven years, from 1998 to 2004, the State of California provided a total of $170 million through annual legislative allocations. Legislative changes in 2004 made provisions to grant the Carl Moyer Program $141 million every year through 2015. Annually, the Air District is awarded a portion of these funds to administer to Bay Area applicants.

The Carl Moyer Program is funded by California Smog Check fees and new tire purchase fees. The State collects and deposits into the Air Pollution Control Fund $6.00 (as of January, 2010) of the motor vehicle smog check fee to implement the Carl Moyer Program “to the extent that…the moneys are expended to mitigate or remediate the harm caused by the type of motor vehicle on which the fee is imposed”. The State also collects a $1.75 fee (as of January, 2010)on each new tire purchase for the Program.

Assembly Bill 1390 requires that air districts across the state with greater than one million inhabitants allocate at least 50% of their Carl Moyer funding in a manner that directly benefits low-income communities and communities of color that are disproportionately affected by air pollution. The Bay Area Air Quality Management District continues to place additional emphasis on funding projects that reduce emissions in its six highest impacted areas within its jurisdiction.

Additionally, Mobile Source Incentive Funds are derived from Assembly Bill 923 (AB923), authorizes Air Districts located within a non-attainment area for any pollutant to impose a surcharge of up to $2.00 on the registration fee of motor vehicles registered in its district in order to pay for Carl Moyer-like projects and other emission reduction programs. The State collects these funds and passes them through directly to the respective Air District.

On December 21, 2004, the Air District's Board of Directors adopted Resolution 2004-16 to increase the surcharge on vehicles registered within the District boundaries from $4.00 to $6.00 per vehicle. The Department of Motor Vehicles began to collect the increased surcharge in May 2005. The revenues from the additional $2.00 surcharge are deposited in the District’s Mobile Source Incentive Fund.

== BAAQMD Carl Moyer program history ==
1998 – Carl Moyer Program is established. The program receives $25 million in funding. The Bay Area Air Quality Management District begins funding engine upgrades in the San Francisco Bay Area.

1999 – California Air Resources Board adopts the first set of Carl Moyer Program Guidelines and enacts legislation to formally establish the statutory framework for the program.

2001 – New legislation requires local districts with populations of over one million to expend 50% of the program funds for projects that operate or are based in environmental justice areas.

2004 – Funding is increased to $141 million per year and continued by new legislation. The program is expanded to include light-duty vehicle projects, agricultural sources of air pollution, and diesel truck pollution.

2005 – Program guidelines are expanded to include off-road projects and zero-emission technologies.

2006 – Air districts are allowed to increase administrative expenditures from 2% of program funds to 5% for air districts with more than 1 million inhabitants and to 10% for those with less than 1 million inhabitants.

2007 - Air District upgrades 300 heavy-duty diesel engines, which reduces emissions by 11,335 tons.

2008 – Program guidelines are revised for the fifth time. The Air District upgrades 360 diesel engines and reduces emissions by 1,291 tons.

== Impacted communities ==
The Bay Area Air Quality Management District Community Air Risk Evaluation (CARE) Program was initiated in 2004 to evaluate and reduce health risks associated with exposures to outdoor Toxic Air Contaminants (TAC’s) in the Bay Area. The program examines TAC emissions with an emphasis on diesel exhaust, which is a major contributor to airborne health risk in California.

The CARE Program found that on-road vehicles contribute 34% of cancer toxicity-weighted emissions in the Bay Area. Further, it found that certain areas, which tend to be low-income areas near transportation corridors, bear a much greater health risk that others, and designated these as Priority Communities.

== See also ==
- Air pollution in California
- California Air Resources Board
- List of California Air Districts
- Environment of California
