= Timeline of major U.S. environmental and occupational health regulation =

- 1916 – National Park Service Organic Act created the National Park Service.
- 1918 – Migratory Bird Treaty Act creates protections for migratory birds.
- 1947 – Los Angeles Air Pollution Control District created; first air pollution agency in the US.
- 1948 – Federal Water Pollution Control Act
- 1955 – National Air Pollution Control Act
- 1959 – California Motor Vehicle Pollution Control Board created to test automobile emissions and set standards.
- 1963 – Clean Air Act (amended in 1965, 1966, 1967, 1969, 1970, 1977, 1990)
- 1964 – Wilderness Act
- 1965 – National Emissions Standards Act
- 1965 – Motor Vehicle Air Pollution Control Act
- 1965 – Solid Waste Disposal Act (amended by RCRA in 1976)
- 1967 – California Air Resources Board established; set emissions standards predating EPA.
- 1967 – Air Quality Act (amendment to CAA)
- 1969 – Federal Coal Mine Health and Safety Act
- 1969 – National Environmental Policy Act (NEPA)
- 1970 – Reorganization Plan No. 3 created the Environmental Protection Agency (EPA) by Presidential Executive Order
- 1970 – Clean Air Act (Extension). Major rewrite of CAA, setting National Ambient Air Quality Standards (NAAQS), New Source Performance Standards (NSPS) Hazardous Air Pollutant standards, and auto emissions tailpipe standards.
- 1970 – Williams-Steiger Occupational Safety and Health Act (created OSHA and NIOSH)
- 1970 – Lead-Based Paint Poisoning Prevention Act
- 1970 – Environmental Quality Improvement Act
- 1972 – Federal Water Pollution Control Amendments of 1972 (P.L. 92-500). Major rewrite.
- 1972 – Federal Insecticide, Fungicide, and Rodenticide Act (FIFRA) (amended by Food Quality Protection Act of 1996)
- 1972 – Marine Protection, Research, and Sanctuaries Act of 1972
- 1973 – Endangered Species Act (amended 1978, 1982)
- 1974 – Safe Drinking Water Act (amended 1986, 1996)
- 1975 – Hazardous Materials Transportation Act
- 1976 – Resource Conservation and Recovery Act (RCRA) (amended 1984, 1996)
- 1976 – Toxic Substances Control Act (TSCA) (amended 2016)
- 1977 – Clean Water Act (amended FWPCA of 1972)
- 1977 – Surface Mining Control and Reclamation Act
- 1978 – National Energy Conservation Policy Act
- 1978 – Endangered Species Act Amendments
- 1980 – Comprehensive Environmental Response, Compensation, and Liability Act (CERCLA). Created the Superfund program.
- 1980 – Alaska National Interest Lands Conservation Act
- 1980 – Fish and Wildlife Conservation Act
- 1982 – Nuclear Waste Policy Act
- 1982 – Endangered Species Act Amendments of 1982
- 1984 – Hazardous and Solid Waste Amendments of 1984
- 1986 – Safe Drinking Water Act Amendments of 1986
- 1986 – Emergency Planning and Community Right-to-Know Act (EPCRKA)
- 1986 – Superfund Amendments and Reauthorization Act (SARA)
- 1987 – Water Quality Act (amended FWPCA of 1972)
- 1989 – Basel Convention
- 1989 – Montreal Protocol on ozone-depleting chemicals enters into force.
- 1990 – Clean Air Act Amendments of 1990. Set new automobile emissions standards, low-sulfur gas, required Best Available Control Technology (BACT) for toxins, reduction in CFCs.
- 1990 – Oil Pollution Act of 1990
- 1991 – Intermodal Surface Transportation Efficiency Act (ISTEA)
- 1992 – Residential Lead-Based Paint Hazard Reduction Act
- 1993 – North American Free Trade Agreement (Implementation Act)
- 1994 – Executive Order 12898 on Environmental Justice
- 1996 – Mercury-Containing and Rechargeable Battery Management Act (P.L. 104-19)
- 1996 – Food Quality Protection Act (amended FIFRA)
- 1996 – Safe Drinking Water Act Amendments of 1996
- 1996 – Land Disposal Program Flexibility Act of 1996
- 1997 – Kyoto Protocol
- 1998 – Transportation Equity Act for the 21st Century (TEA-21)
- 2002 – California AB 1493 sets standards for emissions of CO_{2} and other greenhouse gases from automobiles and light duty trucks.
- 2002 – Small Business Liability Relief and Brownfields Revitalization Act (amended CERCLA)
- 2005 – Energy Policy Act of 2005
- 2005 – Safe, Accountable, Flexible, Efficient Transportation Equity Act: A Legacy for Users (SAFETEA)
- 2007 – Energy Independence and Security Act (EISA)
- 2007 – Washington Declaration
- 2010 – Cancun Agreements
- 2015 – Paris Agreement
- 2016 – Frank R. Lautenberg Chemical Safety for the 21st Century Act (amended TSCA)

== See also ==
- United States Environmental Protection Agency (EPA)
- Occupational Safety and Health Administration (OSHA)
- Timeline of environmental events
- Workers' compensation
