= This is the Public Domain =

Public art project

This is the Public Domain is an art project designed to look at the difficulty in demarcating a piece of land as part of the international commons for perpetuity within the United States.

== History ==
This is the Public Domain was created by San Francisco based artist Amy Balkin. In 2003, Balkin purchased 2.5 acres (10,000 m^{2}) of land in Tehachapi, California with the intention of giving them to a "global everyone." As a means of doing this, Balkin looked into a number of legal strategies within the constraints of property and copyright law.

== Legal Tactics ==
Those working to create This is the Public Domain have attempted a number of legal strategies to achieve their goal. The first was attempting to copyright and then enter into the public domain the land within the project's boundaries as a conceptual artwork. However, the artists involved learned that one can only give away the rights of works which can be reproduced. In order to deal with this limitation, a bench was created and the land was declared an extension of said bench.

The second was to enter the land into the public domain by putting the land into a trust and then distributing the license which allows people to occupy or modify the land. Included in the license is that the land must either be licensed for universal use or for no one's use. Redistribution of this license is allowed, but modification is not.

The final three strategies appear to be theoretical. One is the creation of a bearer corporation which controls the land. The upside to this from the artists' perspective is that the land would have strong legal protection, but they question whether corporate control is the proper way to achieve it. Another is creating a Limited Common Property Regime. This is seen as acceptable if one can include the entire world as members of the regime, but they have doubts about whether or not that would be possible. The final is creating a land trust. However, this would require private ownership, and thus is likely to be rejected.
