= Kim Stringfellow =

American artist, educator, and photographer

- Born: July 31, 1963 (age 62); San Mateo, California
- Education: School of the Art Institute of Chicago, Academy of Art University
- Known for: Photography
- Notable work: Jackrabbit Homestead invisible 5 Safe As Mother's Milk; Greetings from the Salton Sea; The Charmed Horizon
- Awards: Guggenheim Fellowship
- Patrons: California Council for the Humanities; Cornish College of the Arts
- Website: www.kimstringfellow.com

Kim Stringfellow (born 1963) is an American artist, educator, and photographer based out of Joshua Tree, California. She is an associate professor at the San Diego State School of Art, Design, and Art History. Stringfellow has made transmedia documentaries of landscape and the economic effects of environmental issues on humans and habitat. Stringfellow's photographic and multimedia projects engage human/landscape interactions and explore the interrelation of the global and the local.

== Biography ==
Stringfellow received her Bachelor of Fine Arts from the Academy of Art College in San Francisco in 1988. In the year 2000, Stringfellow received her MFA from the School of the Art Institute of Chicago. She became an assistant professor at San Diego State's School of Art, Design, and Art History in 2001 where she was promoted in 2018 to associate professor with tenure at San Diego State University.

A collection of her photographs entitled Photographic Constructions, were exhibited at the Morphos Gallery in San Francisco in 1994. The collection explored personal narratives and addressed spirituality and feminist issues through art history. Among her earliest environmentally-based endeavors include Stringfellow's taking part in Salmoncity.net, a web-based piece of art commissioned by the Seattle Arts Commission in response to the ESA listing of the Puget Sound Chinook salmon as regionally threatened.

== Works ==
Stringfellow has worked on projects for California Humanities, Creative Work Fund, Graham Foundation for Advanced Studies in the Fine Arts, Los Angeles County Arts Commission, Seattle Arts Commission, and Desert X.

=== The Charmed Horizon ===
"The Charmed Horizon" was inspired by excerpts from the 19th century French writer, Lautreamont's Les Chants de Maldoror. The project's purpose was to examine human desire and other emotive issues. Its website was selected as Best Art-Related Site at the 2nd Annual South by Southwest Interactive Web Competitiond in 2019 and was included in the Seventh New York Digital Salon at the School of Visual Arts.

=== The Mojave Project ===
The Mojave Project is a transmedia piece that explores the physical and cultural landscape of the Mojave Desert. This piece began in 2013 and exhibited in Fall of 2018. This project features themes such as Desert as Wasteland, Geological Time vs. Human Time, Sacrifice and Exploitation, Danger and Consequence, Space and Perception, Mobility and Movement, Desert as Staging ground and Transportation and Reinvention.The Mojave Project was awarded a Curatorial Projects Fellowship from The Andy Warhol Foundation for the Visual Arts in 2017.

=== Invisible 5 ===
Invisible-5 is a project created by Stringfellow, Amy Balkin, and Tim Halbur which uses the methods of a self-guided art gallery tour to provide a self-guided tour of the portion of Interstate 5 between San Francisco and Los Angeles.^{[6]} Balkin and Stringfellow launched it in 2006.^{[8]} Its goal is make people who "create a romantic California" by "mentally blotting out" the parts which don't conform to that ideal take the time to see the places they usually ignore.^{[9]}

=== Jackrabbit Homestead ===
A book, downloadable audio tour and website comprise Stringfellow's multimedia project Jackrabbit Homestead.^{[10]} The project examines the legacy of the Small Tract Act of 1938 in the Morongo Basin. It was made possible by a grant from the California Council for the Humanities and Desert X. The book, Jackrabbit Homestead: Tracing the Small Tract Act in the Southern California Landscape, 1938–2008, was published in December 2009 by the Center for American Places. It includes photography and writing by Stringfellow as well as historical illustration.

=== Greetings from the Salton Sea ===
Greetings from the Salton Sea is a project created by Stringfellow, including photography by her and documenting the history of the Salton Sea, California's largest inland body of water.^{[5]} It consists of a book, exhibition, and website.^{[4]} It calls attention to the issue of whether or not it is artificial and suggests possible solutions to the ecological and socioeconomic issues surrounding Salton Sea. The book, Greetings from the Salton Sea: Folly and Intervention in the Southern California Landscape, 1905–2005, was first published in 2005 by the Center for American Places. The book's publication was in part funded by a loan from the Graham Foundation for Advanced Studies in the Fine Arts.

=== Safe as Mothers Milk ===
Safe as Mother's Milk is a multimedia project that examines the history of the Hanford Nuclear Reservation. It was commissioned by Adrian Van Egmond for the Cornish College of the Arts Art + Activism Visiting Artist series in 2002.^{[3]} Stringfellow explores the Hanford and its history, calling attention to events of unplanned and planned releases of radioactive material in the atmosphere while producing plutonium for the U.S. nuclear arsenal. This project serves as an exploration of the area in hopes to educate Hanford's uninformed public on the releasing of radioactive materials during the Cold War era.

=== There It Is – Take It! ===
There It Is – Take It! is a self-guided audio tour that takes the listener through Owens Valley California, which launched in October 2012. This project explores political social and environmental contexts of the Los Angeles Aqueduct system and relates to its history, present and future. This piece features a combination of audio, interviews and music that take the listener through a guided tour along the landscape and builds a relationship between Los Angeles and the Owens Valley.

== Publications ==
- Greetings from the Salton Sea: Folly and Intervention in the Southern California Landscape, 1905–2005. Santa Fe, NM: Center for American Places, 2005. OCLC 607585263.
  - Second edition. Chicago: The Center for American Places at Columbia College Chicago, 2011. ISBN 9781935195320.
- Jackrabbit Homestead: Tracing the Small Tract Act in the Southern California Landscape, 1938–2008. Chicago: Center for American places at Columbia College, 2009. ISBN 978-1935195054.

== Awards ==
- 2012: Theo Westenberger Award for Artistic Excellence, Autry National Center, Los Angeles, CA
- 2015: Guggenheim Fellowship from the John Simon Guggenheim Memorial Foundation
- 2016: Andy Warhol Foundation for the Visual Arts Curatorial Fellowship

== Exhibitions ==
=== Solo exhibitions ===
- Greetings from the Salton Sea, John Michael Kohler Arts Center, 2006
- Jackrabbit Homestead, UC Berkeley Graduate School of Journalism Center for Photography, 2009
- Santa Fe Art Institute 2011
- Jackrabbit Homestead, Autry Museum of the American West, September 2014 – August 2015
- Made in the Mojave, Museum of Art and History, May 13, 2017
- Made in the Mojave, Los Angeles Contemporary Exhibitions, 2018

=== Exhibitions with others ===
- Invisible-5, Cubitt Gallery, Cubitt Artists, London. With Amy Balkin and Tim Halbur.

=== Group exhibitions ===
- Ecotopia: The Second Triennial of Photography and Video, International Center of Photography, New York, September 2006 – January 2007 included Greetings from the Salton Sea
- The Salton Sea: Lost in Paradise, Marks Art Center, March–April 2016
- Desert Waters, Marks Art Center, February–April 2017

== Collections ==
Stringfellow's work is held in the following permanent collection:

- Nevada Museum of Art (Greeting from the Salton Sea)
