= Amy Balkin =

American artist

- Born: San Francisco
- Education: Stanford University
- Known for: Conceptual Art
- Movement: Public Art Conceptual Art
- Awards: The Louis Comfort Tiffany Foundation Award

Amy Balkin is an American artist who studied at Stanford University and is now located in San Francisco. Her work "combines cross-disciplinary research and social critique to generate ambitious, bold, and innovative ways of conceiving the public domain outside current legal and discursive systems." She focuses on how humans create, interact with, and impact the social and material landscapes they inhabit. Ultimately, one of her long-term goals is to create a physical shared space with society.

Invisible-5 is an audio commentary on land use along the highway corridor between San Francisco and Los Angeles.

The project investigates the stories of people and communities fighting for environmental justice along the I-5, through oral histories, field recordings, found sound, recorded music, and archival audio documents. The project also traces natural, social, and economic histories along the route. This project was developed in collaboration with artists Kim Stringfellow and Tim Halbur, and the organizations Pond: Art, Activism, and Ideas, and Greenaction for Health & Environmental Justice. The project is available to listen online or download from invisible5.org.

She has also proposed a project that challenges the scope and intent of current US or international laws relating to property ownership and pollution, and which are intended to expose the limitations and ideological biases of these laws. One such project Public Smog involves the creation of clean air parks created by retiring emission offsets, paired with an attempt to add the Earth's atmosphere to UNESCO’s World Heritage list. However, these ideas have art-based roots.

== Projects ==
Public Smog is a public park in the atmosphere that fluctuates in location and scale. Built through financial, legal, or political activities, Public Smog is subject to prevailing winds and the long-range transport of aerosols and gases. When built through the economic mechanism of emissions trading, the park opens above the region where offsets are purchased and withheld from use. Public Smog first opened briefly to the public during 2004 above California’s South Coast Air Quality Management District, and is now open over the European Union through 2008.

Balkin's project This is the Public Domain is an ongoing attempt to create a permanent international commons from a parcel of land purchased by the artist in Southern California. Thus far, the group has purchased 2.5 acres (10,000 m^{2}) of land in Tehachapi, California. Sharing of this land will be initiated when a juridical solution for public handover is found.

Her recent works include a public reading, "Climate Change 2007: Synthesis Report Summary for Policymakers" (2008), and a series of large-format rubbings of architectural signage of San Francisco-area entities implicated in war-related activities and illegal domestic surveillance, "Sell Us Your Liberty, Or We’ll Subcontract Your Death" (2008).

She has collaborated with her husband Josh On on the Greenpeace project Exxonsecrets.org and was the recipient of the Louis Comfort Tiffany Foundation Award in 2007.

Amy Balkin joined Cape Farewell on the 2007 Art/Science expedition. Taking almost three weeks, the expedition crossed the north Atlantic to the extreme frontline of climate change, then sailed south to explore East Greenland's Blosseville Coast.

Amy Balkin's collaborative project A People’s Archive of Sinking and Melting (2012–ongoing) manifests through an open call for items from places around the world that may disappear due to climate change. Initiated in 2012, the collection now holds approximately 200 objects from individuals from over 18 countries and regions, such as Antarctica, Mexico, and Cape Verde. Ranging from tools and utensils to printed ephemera, Balkin et al.’s archive creates a physical, political, and economic portrait of the effects of rising sea levels, coastal erosion, and desertification through object stories. The project humanizes these concepts, typically dispersed through abstract facts and figures, by displaying them in visual form. This deeply personal index of localized environmental destruction also creates a globalized account of shared experiences and speaks to the income inequality and political exclusion of individuals in places most likely to disappear. The work was shown in the exhibition "Radical Landscapes" at di Rosa in 2016.

== Additional References ==
- T.J. Demos, "Art After Nature: The Post-Natural Condition," Artforum (April 2012), 191–97.
- Down to a fine art by Anna Minton, The Guardian, January 10, 2007.
- Walter and McBean Gallery at SFAI
- Public Smog
- This is the Public Domain
- Tomorrow Morning
- Southern Exposure: Amy Balkin
- Invisible 5
- documenta (13) participating artist bio
