= Texas Low Emission Diesel standards =

Texas Low Emission Diesel standards (TxLED) are rules regulating the quality of diesel fuels, intended to reduce pollutants (especially NOx). Since October 31, 2005, diesel fuel to be consumed by engines in 110 counties in Eastern Texas must meet these requirements:

- Maximum aromatic hydrocarbon content of 10% by volume.
- Minimum cetane number of 48.

Alternatively, diesel fuel that complies with the specifications of a California Air Resources Board (CARB) certified alternative diesel formulation that was approved by CARB before January 18, 2005, may be used, as can fuel approved by the Texas Commission on Environmental Quality (TCEQ) that is proven to have emissions equivalent to or less than TxLED compliant fuel.
