= Performance-based regulation =

Type of utility rulemaking

Performance-based regulation (PBR) is an approach to utility regulation designed to strengthen utility performance incentives. Thus defined, the term PBR is synonymous with incentive regulation. The two most common forms of PBR are award-penalty mechanisms ("APMs") and multiyear rate plans ("MRPs"). Both involve mathematical formulas that can lower regulatory cost at the same time that they encourage better performance. This constitutes a remarkable potential advance in the "technology" of regulation. Economic theorists whose work has supported the development of PBR include Nobel prize-winning economist Jean Tirole.

Implementation of applicable methods of incentive regulation represents a complex problem for regulatory authorities. Therefore, this problem should be analyzed though different aspects, taking into consideration parameters, such as incentive's mechanism defined by regulatory authorities, enabling thus the development of regulated activity and increase of efficiency and productivity.

== Award Penalty Mechanisms ==
An APM is designed to strengthen performance incentives in targeted areas. It is sometimes for this reason called a targeted performance incentive. Basic components of such mechanisms include a key performance indicator (called an "output" in Britain), a performance appraisal that compares the utility's value for the indicator to a benchmark value, and a mechanism for adjusting utility rates to reflect the performance appraisal. Here are some common performance areas targeted by APMs.

- Reliability (e.g. SAIDI, SAIFI)
- Other customer service dimensions (e.g. telephone response time)
- Demand-side management (e.g. estimated net benefits)
- Cost (e.g. cost/dkth of gas procured)

APMs targeting cost are often used to bolster incentives when a regulatory system features a mechanism, such as a fuel cost adjustment clause, that is believed to weaken cost containment incentives.

== Multiyear Rate Plans ==
MRPs are the most common approach to PBR around the world. An MRP features a moratorium on rate cases which typically lasts three to five years. An attrition relief mechanism ("ARM") adjusts rates or revenues automatically between rate cases to reflect inflation and other changes in business conditions. Some costs are typically addressed separately using cost trackers. Some MRPs feature earnings sharing mechanisms that share surplus or deficit earnings between the utility and customers when the return on equity deviates from its target. Plans may also feature an efficiency carryover mechanism that incentivizes long term performance gains and discourages the opportunistic timing of expenses by permitting the utility to keep a share of cost savings (or absorb a share of high costs) when rates are trued up to cost at the end of the plan.

Since infrequent rate cases lessen concerns about cost allocations and cross-subsidies, MRPs can permit regulators to sanction greater marketing flexibility. Most MRPs also include APMs to balance incentives for cost containment with incentives to pursue other goals (e.g. reliability or energy conservation) that matter to customers.

The design of the ARM is a key issue in a proceeding to approve an MRP. Several approaches to ARM design are well established.

- An index-based ARM is developed using industry price and productivity research and is calibrated to produce superior returns for superior productivity performance. This approach was developed in the United States but is more popular today in Canada and countries overseas. US utilities that have operated under index-based ARMs include Boston Gas, Central Maine Power, San Diego Gas & Electric, Southern California Gas, and NSTAR.
- A stairstep ARM increases revenue by a certain percentage each year, with the percentages set in advance. This gives allowed revenue a stairstep trajectory. This is currently the most popular approach to ARM design in the United States. It is currently used by utilities in California, Georgia, Colorado, North Dakota, and New York.
- Two hybrid approaches to ARM design have been widely used. In North America, the allowance for O&M expenses may be indexed, while the allowance for capital cost has a stairstep trajectory. This approach to ARM design was developed in California, where the frequency of general rate cases has been limited since the 1980s. It is currently used in the MRP of Southern California Edison. In Britain, a multiyear cost forecast is approved and a revenue cap index with an RPI – X formula (RPI is the retail price index) is chosen that yields equivalent net present value. A similar approach to ARM design is used in Australia.

== Precedents ==
In North America, MRPs have been especially popular where utilities need marketing flexibility. Such plans have helped railroads, oil pipelines, and telecommunications utilities provide a complex array of services to markets with diverse competitive pressures from a common set of assets. Most of these plans featured index-based ARMs called "price caps". Early papers encouraging the use of input price and productivity research in ARM design include Sudit (1979) and Baumol (1982).

MRPs are also favored for energy distributors in most populous provinces of Canada and are increasingly popular for gas and electric utilities in the United States.

Overseas, the privatization of many utilities in the last 20 years has forced governments to choose a regulatory system. The majority have chosen MRPs over cost of service regulation. Regulators in Britain, Australia, Germany, the Netherlands, and New Zealand are recognized MRP leaders.

The British approach to MRP design dates back to the early 1980s. The latest version of this approach, called "RIIO" (Revenue = Incentives + Innovation + Outputs), has been implemented for gas and power transmission utilities and will begin for power distributors in 2015. The heart of the RIIO system is an MRP, which the British call a "price control". A revenue cap ARM has an RPI - X formula. The typical plan term is 8 years. Since the ARM is based on multiyear cost forecasts, the regulator must carefully review utility business plans. Statistical benchmarking and independent engineering studies loom large in cost appraisals. 30 months is typically required to process a RIIO application. There are APMs for a wide range of outputs. Special cost trackers fund innovative projects.

== Outlook ==
Recent developments have increased the potential usefulness of MRPs in US electric utility regulation.

- Slower volume growth due to conservation, slow economic growth, and increased distributed generation has reduced the "gravy" many utilities relied on in the past to help finance cost growth.
- Natural gas-fired technologies have replaced solid-fuel technologies as the low cost choice for incremental generating capacity.
- Vertically integrated electric utility needs fewer plant additions, and those that it does need are smaller than in the past.
- Some utilities are engaged in accelerated modernization of distribution systems that involve high levels of capital expenditure for several years.
- Diffusion of "smart grid" technologies creates opportunities for new products and services.
- Some customers will pay a premium for better quality service.

Under cost of service regulation, utilities will respond to these conditions by filing rate cases more frequently and requesting additional marketing flexibility. Frequent rate cases raise regulatory cost and weaken utility cost containment incentives. The recurrent issues of cost allocation and cross-subsidies will incline regulators to discourage desired marketing flexibility. Suggestive studies indicate that MRPs in the form of price caps may reduce rate escalation for consumers.

RIIO has recently been touted as a promising approach to regulating US electric utilities in an era of smart grid innovations and increased distributed generation. Advantages of the RIIO approach include the mandatory consideration of multiyear investment strategies. However, many components of RIIO (e.g. MRPs and APMs) are already widely used in America, and Americans have developed their own approaches to addressing certain regulatory challenges. For example, integrated resource planning has been used for years in some states, and planning can be extended to incorporate DG and smart grid innovations. Shared savings incentives have long been used for utility conservation programs and can be extended to distributed generation. There is a long tradition of "pilot" projects to encourage innovation. Alternative approaches to ARM design are more familiar and can lower implementation costs.

== Alternative definition ==
PBR is sometimes defined more narrowly as that subset of IR in which mechanisms are calibrated using statistical research to yield superior (or inferior) returns for superior (or inferior) performance. One example of PBR that conforms to this definition is an MRP with an index-based ARM that is calibrated so that utilities earn superior (inferior) returns for productivity growth exceeding (falling short of) the industry norm. Another example is an APM for reliability that uses a benchmark reflecting industry norms.

Such approach is called regulatory benchmarking. If properly applied, benchmarking presents new incentives for a regulated firms to behave efficiently. However, regulatory benchmarking is subject to many issues. For instance, regulated companies may be motivated to short-term savings which result in postponement of investments, which may result in the deterioration of quality of service. Also, the quality of data is crucial.
