= List of California air districts =

In 1947, the State of California enacted the Air Pollution Control Act that authorized the creation of Air Pollution Control Districts (APCD) or Air Quality Management Districts (AQMD) in every county of the State. California has 22 APCDs, 12 AQMDs and 1 Air Resources District for a total of 35 districts:

- Amador County APCD (all of Amador County)
- Antelope Valley AQMD (Northeast portion of Los Angeles County)
- Bay Area AQMD (Alameda, Contra Costa, Marin, Napa, San Francisco, San Mateo, Santa Clara, western portion of Solano, southern portion of Sonoma counties)
- Butte County AQMD (all of Butte County)
- Calaveras County APCD (all of Calaveras County)
- Colusa County APCD (all of Colusa County)
- Eastern Kern APCD (Eastern portion of Kern County)
- El Dorado County AQMD (all of El Dorado County)
- Feather River AQMD (all of Sutter and Yuba counties)
- Glenn County APCD (all of Glenn County)
- Great Basin Unified APCD (all of Alpine, Inyo, and Mono counties)
- Imperial County APCD (all of Imperial County)
- Lake County AQMD (all of Lake County)
- Lassen County APCD (all of Lassen County)
- Mariposa County APCD (all of Mariposa County)
- Mendocino County AQMD (all of Mendocino County)
- Modoc County APCD (all of Modoc County)
- Mojave Desert AQMD (Northern portion of San Bernardino County, eastern portion of Riverside County)
- Monterey Bay Air Resources District (all of Monterey, San Benito, Santa Cruz counties)
- North Coast Unified AQMD (all of Del Norte, Humboldt, Trinity counties)
- Northern Sierra AQMD (all of Nevada, Plumas, Sierra counties)
- Northern Sonoma County APCD (Northern portion of Sonoma County)
- Placer County APCD (all of Placer County)
- Sacramento Metropolitan AQMD (all of Sacramento County)
- San Diego County APCD (all of San Diego County)
- San Joaquin Valley APCD (all of Fresno, Kings, Madera, Merced, San Joaquin, Stanislaus, Tulare, and Valley air basin portions of Kern counties)
- San Luis Obispo County APCD (all of San Luis Obispo County)
- Santa Barbara County APCD (all of Santa Barbara County)
- Shasta County AQMD (all of Shasta County)
- Siskiyou County APCD (all of Siskiyou County)
- South Coast AQMD (Los Angeles County except for Antelope Valley AQMD, Orange County, western portion of San Bernardino and western portion of Riverside counties)
- Tehama County APCD (all of Tehama County)
- Tuolumne County APCD (all of Tuolumne County)
- Ventura County APCD (all of Ventura County)
- Yolo-Solano AQMD (all of Yolo and eastern portion of Solano counties)

== History ==
The California Air Pollution Control District Act of 1947 allowed 1 or more counties to form air pollution districts. The California Bay Area Pollution Control Act of 1955 created the Bay Area Air Pollution Control District. The California Mulford-Carrell Air Resources Act of 1967 resulted in the creation of 11 air basins.
