= Emission standard =

Legal requirements governing air pollutants released into the atmosphere

Emission standards are the legal requirements governing air pollutants released into the atmosphere. Emission standards set quantitative limits on the permissible amount of specific air pollutants that may be released from specific sources over specific timeframes. They are generally designed to achieve air quality standards and to protect human life. Different regions and countries have different standards for vehicle emissions.

== Regulated sources ==
Many emissions standards focus on regulating pollutants released by automobiles (motor cars) and other powered vehicles. Others regulate emissions from industry, power plants, small equipment such as lawn mowers and diesel generators, and other sources of air pollution.

The first automobile emissions standards were enacted in 1963 in the United States, mainly as a response to Los Angeles' smog problems. Three years later Japan enacted their first emissions rules, followed between 1970 and 1972 by Canada, Australia, and several European nations. The early standards mainly concerned carbon monoxide (CO) and hydrocarbons (HC). Regulations on nitrogen oxide emissions (NO_{x}) were introduced in the United States, Japan, and Canada in 1973 and 1974, with Sweden following in 1976 and the European Economic Community in 1977. These standards gradually grew more and more stringent but have never been unified.

There are largely three main sets of standards: United States, Japanese, and European, with various markets mostly using these as their base. Sweden, Switzerland, and Australia had separate emissions standards for many years but have since adopted the European standards. India, China, and other newer markets have also begun enforcing vehicle emissions standards (derived from the European requirements) in the twenty-first century, as growing vehicle fleets have given rise to severe air quality problems there, too.

== Vehicle emission performance standard ==
An emission performance standard is a limit that sets thresholds above which a different type of vehicle emissions control technology might be needed. While emission performance standards have been used to dictate limits for conventional pollutants such as oxides of nitrogen and oxides of sulphur (NO_{x} and SO_{x}), this regulatory technique may be used to regulate greenhouse gases, particularly carbon dioxide (CO_{2}). In the US, this is given in pounds of carbon dioxide per megawatt-hour (lbs. CO_{2}/MWhr), and kilograms CO_{2}/MWhr elsewhere.

== Africa ==
=== ECOWAS ===
- Since 1 January 2021, all new vehicles in ECOWAS must comply with Euro 4.

=== Morocco ===
From 1 January 2024, all new vehicles in Morocco must comply with Euro 6b.

=== South Africa ===
South Africa's first clean fuels programme was implemented in 2006 with the banning of lead from petrol and the reduction of sulphur levels in diesel from 3,000 parts per million (ppm) to 500 ppm, along with a niche grade of 50 ppm.

The Clean Fuels 2 standard, expected to begin in 2017, includes the reduction of sulphur to 10 ppm; the lowering of benzene from 5 percent to 1 percent of volume; the reduction of aromatics from 50 percent to 35 percent of volume; and the specification of olefins at 18 percent of volume.

== North America ==
=== Canada ===
In Canada, the Canadian Environmental Protection Act, 1999 (CEPA 1999) transfers the legislative authority for regulating emissions from on-road vehicles and engines to Environment Canada from Transport Canada's Motor Vehicle Safety Act. The Regulations align emission standards with the U.S. federal standards and apply to light-duty vehicles (e.g., passenger cars), light-duty trucks (e.g., vans, pickup trucks, sport utility vehicles), heavy-duty vehicles (e.g., trucks and buses), heavy-duty engines and motorcycles.

=== Mexico ===
- From 1 July 2019, all new heavy vehicles must comply with EPA 07 and Euro 5.
- From 1 January 2025, all new heavy vehicles must comply with EPA 10 and Euro 6.

=== United States ===
The United States has its own set of emissions standards that all new vehicles must meet. In the United States, emissions standards are managed by the Environmental Protection Agency (EPA). It uses tiers to identify emission standards for cars, trucks and other motor vehicles. In 2014, the EPA published its "Tier 3" standards for these vehicles, which tightened air pollution emission requirements and lowered the sulfur content in gasoline.

EPA has separate regulations for small engines, such as groundskeeping equipment. The states must also promulgate miscellaneous emissions regulations in order to comply with the National Ambient Air Quality Standards.

In December 2021 EPA issued new greenhouse gas standards for passenger cars and light trucks, effective for the 2023 vehicle model year.

==== State-level standards ====
Under federal law, the state of California is allowed to promulgate more stringent vehicle emissions standards (subject to EPA approval), and other states may choose to follow either the national or California standards. California had produced air quality standards prior to EPA, with severe air quality problems in the Los Angeles metropolitan area. LA is the country's second-largest city, by population, and relies much more heavily on automobiles and has less favorable meteorological conditions than the largest and third-largest cities (New York and Chicago).

Some states have areas within the state that require emissions testing while other cities within the state do not require emission testing. Arizona emissions testing locations are located primarily in the two largest metropolitan areas (Phoenix and Tucson). People outside of these areas are not required to submit their vehicle for testing as these areas are the only ones that have failed the air quality tests by the state.

California's emissions standards are set by the California Air Resources Board (CARB). By mid-2009, 16 other states had adopted CARB rules; given the size of the California market plus these other states, many manufacturers choose to build to the CARB standard when selling in all 50 states. CARB's policies have also influenced EU emissions standards.

California is attempting to regulate greenhouse gas emissions from automobiles, but faces a court challenge from the federal government. The states are also attempting to compel the federal EPA to regulate greenhouse gas emissions, which as of 2007 it has declined to do. On 19 May 2009, news reports indicate that the Federal EPA will largely adopt California's standards on greenhouse gas emissions.

California and several other western states have passed bills requiring performance-based regulation of greenhouse gases from electricity generation.

In an effort to decrease emissions from heavy-duty diesel engines faster, CARB's Carl Moyer Program funds upgrades that are in advance of regulations.

The California ARB standard for light vehicle emissions is a regulation of equipment first, with verification of emissions second. The property owner of the vehicle is not permitted to modify, improve, or innovate solutions in order to pass a true emissions-only standard set for their vehicle driven on public highways. Therefore, California's attempt at regulation of emissions is a regulation of equipment, not of air quality. Vehicle owners are excluded from modifying their property in any way that has not been extensively researched and approved by CARB and still operate them on public highways.

== South America ==
=== Argentina ===
- From 1 January 2016, all new heavy vehicles in Argentina must comply with Euro 5.
- From 1 January 2018, all new light and heavy vehicles in Argentina must comply with Euro 5.

=== Brazil ===
- From 1 January 2012, all new heavy vehicles in Brazil must comply with Proconve P7 (similar to Euro 5)
- From 1 January 2015, all new light vehicles in Brazil must comply with Proconve L6 (similar to Euro 5).
- From 1 January 2022, all new light vehicles in Brazil must comply with Proconve L7 (similar to Euro 6).
- From 1 January 2023, all new heavy vehicles in Brazil must comply with Proconve P8 (similar to Euro 6).
- From 1 January 2025, the new light vehicle fleets in Brazil must comply with the first stage of Proconve L8 (automaker average).

=== Chile ===
- From September 2014, all new cars in Chile must comply with Euro 5.
- From September 2022, all new light and medium vehicle models in Chile must comply with Euro 6b.
- From 30 September 2025, all new light and medium vehicle models in Chile must comply with Euro 6c.

=== Colombia ===
- From 1 January 2023, all new vehicles in Colombia must comply with Euro 6b.

=== Peru ===
- From 1 April 2018, Euro 4, Tier 2, and EPA 2007 are mandated.
- From 1 October 2024, Euro 6b, Tier 3, and EPA 2010 are mandated.

== Asia ==
=== Cambodia ===
Since 1 January 2022, all new vehicles in Cambodia must comply with Euro 4.

From 1 January 2027, all new vehicles in Cambodia must comply with Euro 5.

=== China ===
Due to rapidly expanding wealth and prosperity, the number of coal power plants and cars on China's roads is rapidly growing, creating an ongoing pollution problem. China enacted its first emissions controls on automobiles in 2000, equivalent to Euro I standards. China's State Environmental Protection Administration (SEPA) upgraded emission controls again on 1 July 2004 to the Euro II standard. More stringent emission standard, National Standard III, equivalent to Euro III standards, went into effect on 1 July 2007. Plans were for Euro IV standards to take effect in 2010. Beijing introduced the Euro IV standard in advance on 1 January 2008, becoming the first city in mainland China to adopt this standard.

- Since 1 January 2018, all new vehicles must comply with China 5 (similar to Euro 5).
- Since 1 January 2021, all new vehicles in China must comply with China 6a (similar to Euro 6).
- Since 1 July 2023, all new vehicles in China must comply with China 6b (stricter than Euro 6).

=== Hong Kong ===
From 1 January 2006, all new passenger cars with spark-ignition engines in Hong Kong must meet either Euro IV petrol standard, Japanese Heisei 17 standard or US EPA Tier 2 Bin 5 standard. For new passenger cars with compression-ignition engines, they must meet US EPA Tier 2 Bin 5 standard.

The current standard is Euro 6C, it has been phased in since 2019.

=== India ===
Bharat stage emission standards are emission standards instituted by the Government of India to regulate the output of air pollutants from internal combustion engine equipment, including motor vehicles. The standards and the timeline for implementation are set by the Central Pollution Control Board under the Ministry of Environment & Forests.

The standards, based on European regulations were first introduced in 2000. Progressively stringent norms have been rolled out since then. All new vehicles manufactured after the implementation of the norms have to be compliant with the regulations. By 2014, the country was under a combination of Euro 3 and Euro 4-based norms, with Euro 4 standards partly implemented in 13 major cities. Till April 2017, the entire country was under BS IV norms, which is based on Euro 4.

As of now manufacturing and registration of BS VI vehicles has started, from April 2020 all BS VI manufacturing is mandatory, respectively.

=== Japan ===
Background

Starting 10 June 1968, the Japanese Government passed the Air Pollution Control Act, which regulated all sources of air pollutants. As a result of the 1968 law, dispute resolution was established under the 1970 Air Pollution Dispute Resolution Act. As a result of the 1970 law, the first installment of four sets of new emissions standards was introduced in 1973. Interim standards were introduced on 1 January 1975, and again for 1976. The final set of standards was introduced for 1978.

While the standards were introduced they were not made immediately mandatory, instead tax breaks were offered for cars which passed them. The standards were based on those adopted by the original US Clean Air Act of 1970, but the test cycle included more slow city driving to correctly reflect the Japanese situation.

The 1978 limits for mean emissions during a "Hot Start Test" of CO, hydrocarbons, and NO_{x} were 2.1 grams per kilometre (3.38 g/mi) of CO, 0.25 grams per kilometre (0.40 g/mi) of HC, and 0.25 grams per kilometre (0.40 g/mi) of NO_{x} respectively. Maximum limits are 2.7 grams per kilometre (4.35 g/mi) of CO, 0.39 grams per kilometre (0.63 g/mi) of HC, and 0.48 grams per kilometre (0.77 g/mi) of NO_{x}. One interesting detail of the Japanese emissions standards was that they were introduced gradually; that is, 1978 model-year cars could be sold that did not meet the 1978 standards, but they would face various tax penalties. This gave manufacturers breathing room to properly engineer solutions and also incentivized fixing the best-selling models first, leading to smoother adoption of clean air standards and fewer drivability concerns than in many other markets.

The "10 - 15 Mode Hot Cycle" test, used to determine individual fuel economy ratings and emissions observed from the vehicle being tested, uses a specific testing regime.

In 1992, to cope with NO_{x} pollution problems from existing vehicle fleets in highly populated metropolitan areas, the Ministry of the Environment adopted the Law Concerning Special Measures to Reduce the Total Amount of Nitrogen Oxides Emitted from Motor Vehicles in Specified Areas, called in short The Motor Vehicle NO_{x} Law. The regulation designated a total of 196 communities in the Tokyo, Saitama, Kanagawa, Osaka and Hyogo Prefectures as areas with significant air pollution due to nitrogen oxides emitted from motor vehicles. Under the Law, several measures had to be taken to control NO_{x} from in-use vehicles, including enforcing emission standards for specified vehicle categories.

The regulation was amended in June 2001 to tighten the existing NO_{x} requirements and to add PM control provisions. The amended rule is called the "Law Concerning Special Measures to Reduce the Total Amount of Nitrogen Oxides and Particulate Matter Emitted from Motor Vehicles in Specified Areas", or in short the Automotive NO_{x} and PM Law.

Emission Standards

The NO_{x} and PM Law introduces emission standards for specified categories of in-use highway vehicles including commercial goods (cargo) vehicles such as trucks and vans, buses, and special purpose motor vehicles, irrespective of the fuel type. The regulation also applies to diesel powered passenger cars (but not to gasoline cars).

In-use vehicles in the specified categories must meet 1997/98 emission standards for the respective new vehicle type (in the case of heavy duty engines NO_{x} = 4.5 g/kWh, PM = 0.25 g/kWh). In other words, the 1997/98 new vehicle standards are retroactively applied to older vehicles already on the road. Vehicle owners have two methods to comply:

1. Replace old vehicles with newer, cleaner models
2. Retrofit old vehicles with approved NO_{x} and PM control devices

Vehicles have a grace period, between 8 and 12 years from the initial registration, to comply. The grace period depends on the vehicle type, as follows:

- Light commercial vehicles (GVW ≤ 2500 kg): 8 years
- Heavy commercial vehicles (GVW > 2500 kg): 9 years
- Micro buses (11-29 seats): 10 years
- Large buses (≥ 30 seats): 12 years
- Special vehicles (based on a cargo truck or bus): 10 years
- Diesel passenger cars: 9 years

Furthermore, the regulation allows fulfillment of its requirements to be postponed by an additional 0.5–2.5 years, depending on the age of the vehicle. This delay was introduced in part to harmonize the NO_{x} and PM Law with the Tokyo diesel retrofit program.

The NO_{x} and PM Law is enforced in connection with Japanese vehicle inspection program, where non-complying vehicles cannot undergo the inspection in the designated areas. This, in turn, may trigger an injunction on the vehicle operation under the Road Transport Vehicle Law.

==== Emission Regulations in Japan for vehicles ====
Table chart for Gasoline-fueled or LPG- fueled Motor Vehicles, Diesel-Powered Motor Vehicles, and Vehicle Fuel Efficiency Standards.

=== Thailand ===
From 1 January 2024, all new vehicles in Thailand must comply with Euro 5.

=== Turkey ===
Diesel and gasoline sulphur content is regulated at 10 ppm. Turkey currently follows Euro VI for heavy duty commercial vehicles, and, in 2016 a couple of years after the EU, Turkey adopted Euro 6 for new types of light duty vehicles (LDV) and new types of passenger cars. Turkey is planning to use the worldwide harmonized light vehicles test procedure (WLTP).

However, despite these tailpipe emission standards for new vehicle types there are many older diesel vehicles, no low-emission zones and no national limit on PM2.5 particulates so local pollution, including from older vehicles, is still a major health risk in some cities, such as Ankara. Concentrations of PM2.5 are 41 μg/m^{3} in Turkey, making it the country with the worst air pollution in Europe. The regulation for testing of existing vehicle exhaust gases is Official Newspaper number 30004 published 11 March 2017.

An average of 135 g CO_{2}/km for LDVs compared well with other countries in 2015, however unlike the EU there is no limit on carbon dioxide emissions.

=== Vietnam ===
From 1 January 2022, all new cars in Vietnam must comply with Euro 5.

== Europe ==
Before the European Union began streamlining emissions standards, there were several different sets of rules. Members of the European Economic Community (EEC) had a unified set of rules, considerably laxer than those of the United States or Japan. These were tightened gradually, beginning on cars of over two liters displacement as the price increase would have less of an impact in this segment. The ECE 15/05 norms (also known as the Luxemburg accord, strict enough to essentially require catalytic converters) began taking effect gradually: the initial step applied to cars of over 2000 cc in two stages, in October 1988 and October 1989. There followed cars between 1.4 and 2.0 liters, in October 1991 and then October 1993. Cars of under 1400 cc had to meet two subsequent sets of regulations that applied in October 1992 and October 1994 respectively. French and Italian car manufacturers, strongly represented in the small car category, had been lobbying heavily against these regulations throughout the 1980s.

Within the EEC, Germany was a leader in regulating automobile emissions. Germany gave financial incentives to buyers of cars that met US or ECE standards, with lesser credits available to those that partially fulfilled the requirements. These incentives had a strong impact; only 6.5 percent of new cars registered in Germany in 1988 did not meet any emissions requirements and 67.3 percent were compliant with the strictest US or ECE standards.

Sweden was one of the first countries to instill stricter rules, in 1975. The legislations required significant modifications and thus severely limited the number of vehicles available there, as manufacturers could not justify the expenditure to meet specific regulations that applied only in one very small market. These standards also caused drivability problems and steeply increased fuel consumption. In 1982, the European Community calculated that the Swedish standards increased fuel consumption by 9 percent, while making cars 2.5 percent more expensive. In 1983, Switzerland (and then Australia) joined in the same set of regulations, which gradually increased the number of certified engines. One problem with the strict standards was that they did not account for catalyzed engines, meaning that vehicles thus equipped had to have the catalytic converters removed before they could be legally registered.

In 1985 the first catalyzed cars entered certain European markets such as Germany. At first, the availability of unleaded petrol was limited and sales were small. In Sweden, catalyzed vehicles became allowed in 1987, benefitting from a tax rebate to boost sales. By 1989 the Swiss/Swedish emissions rules were tightened to the point that non-catalyzed cars were no longer able to be sold. In early 1989 the BMW Z1 was introduced, only available with catalyzed engines. This was a problem in some places like Portugal, where unleaded fuel was still almost non-existent, although European standards required unleaded gasoline to be "available" in every country by 1 October 1989.

=== European Union ===
The main source of greenhouse gas emissions in the European Union is transportation. In 2019, it contributes to about 31% of global emissions and 24% of emissions in the EU. In addition, up to the COVID-19 pandemic, emissions have only increased in the transport economic sector. In 2019, about 95% of the fuel came from fossil sources.

The European Union has its own set of emissions standards that all new vehicles must meet. Currently, standards are set for all road vehicles, trains, barges and 'nonroad mobile machinery' (such as tractors). No standards apply to seagoing ships or airplanes.

EU Regulation No 443/2009 set an average CO_{2} emissions target for new passenger cars of 130 grams per kilometre. The target was gradually phased in between 2012 and 2015. A target of 95 grams per kilometre applies from 2021.

For light commercial vehicle, an emissions target of 175 g/km applies from 2017, and 147 g/km from 2020, a reduction of 16%.

The EU introduced Euro 4 effective 1 January 2008, Euro 5 effective 1 January 2010, and Euro 6 effective 1 January 2014. These dates had been postponed for two years to give oil refineries the opportunity to modernize their plants.

From January 2022, all new light vehicles must comply with Euro 6d. From 1 January 2023, all new motorcycles must comply with Euro 5.

=== Russia ===
- All new light vehicles must comply with Euro 5 since January 2016.
- All new heavy vehicles must comply with Euro 5 since 2018.

=== UK ===
Several local authorities in the UK have introduced Euro 4 or Euro 5 emissions standards for taxis and licensed private hire vehicles to operate in their area. Emissions tests on diesel cars have not been carried out during MOTs in Northern Ireland for 12 years, despite being legally required.

From January 2022, all new light vehicles must comply with Euro 6d. From 1 January 2023, all new motorcycles must comply with Euro 5.

== Oceania ==
=== Australia ===
Australian noxious emission standards are based on European regulations for light-duty and heavy-duty (heavy goods) vehicles, with acceptance of selected US and Japanese standards. The current policy is to fully harmonize Australian regulations with United Nations (UN) and Economic Commission for Europe (ECE) standards. In November 2013, the first stage of the stringent Euro 5 emission standards for light vehicles was introduced, which includes cars and light commercial vehicles. The development of emission standards for highway vehicles and engines is coordinated by the National Transport Commission (NTC) and the regulations—Australian Design Rules (ADR)—are administered by the Department of Infrastructure and Transport.

All new vehicles manufactured or sold in the country must comply with the standards, which are tested by running the vehicle or engine in a standardized test cycle.

In April 2023, the Australian government released its National Electric Vehicle Strategy, which included a commitment to introduce a Fuel Efficiency Standard to address greenhouse gas emissions. The government undertook consultation on the model for the standard in April and May 2023, and they intend to introduce legislation by the end of 2023 Research commissioned by environmental NGO Solar Citizens has calculated that a Fuel Efficiency Standard that started at 95g CO_{2}/km and reduced to 0g CO_{2}/km over ten years would save Australian motorists $11b over the first five years.

From December 2025, all new vehicles sold in Australia will have to comply with Euro 6d.

== See also ==
- C. Arden Pope
- Carbon dioxide equivalent
- The Center for Clean Air Policy (in the US)
- Emission factor
- Emission test cycle
- Emissions trading
- Environmental standard
- European emission standards
- Driving cycle
- Flexible-fuel vehicle
- Fuel efficiency
- Mobile emission reduction credit
- Motor vehicle emissions
- National Emissions Standards for Hazardous Air Pollutants
- Ultra-low-sulfur diesel
- Vehicle emissions control
