= Spare the Air program =

Air pollution mitigation program in the Bay Area

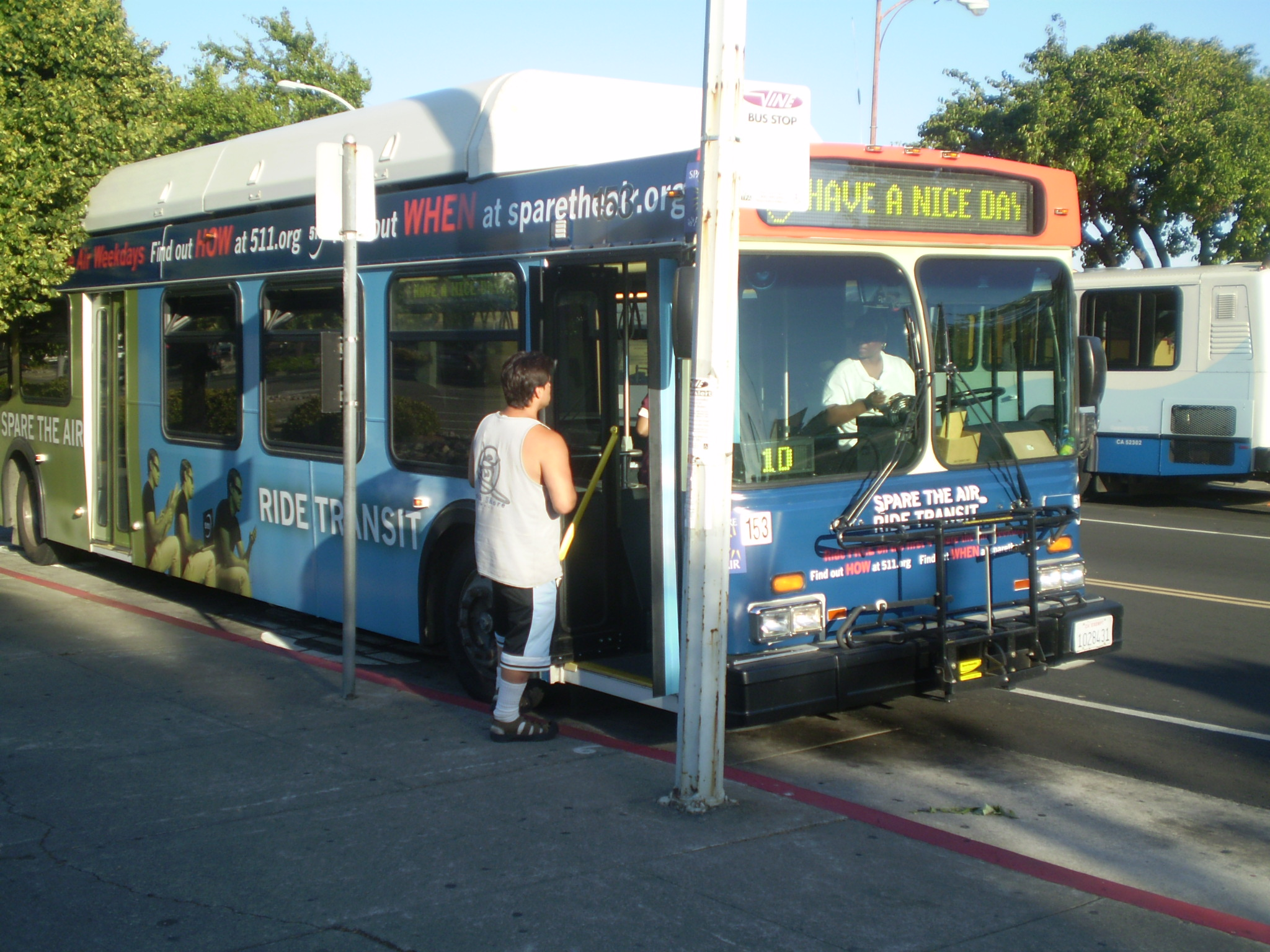
Bus wrapped in Spare the Air promotional material

Spare the Air is a program established by the Bay Area Air Quality Management District in 1991 to combat air pollution during the summer in the San Francisco Bay Area, the season when clear skies, hot temperatures, lighter winds, and a strong temperature inversion combine and trap air pollutants near the ground.

Spare the Air days are declared for days in which levels of ground-level ozone (a constituent of smog) are predicted to exceed the EPA's federal health-based standard of 84 ppb, or an air quality index over 100. On a Spare the Air day, Bay Area residents are asked through radio and television announcements to reduce their driving, refrain from using gas-powered gardening equipment and curb other air polluting activities such as painting and aerosol spray can usage. People especially sensitive to smog are advised to limit their time outdoors.

Spare the Air nights are also issued during the winter when particulate emissions often coming from wood burning and other activities become trapped in stagnant air masses. During winter Spare the Air nights, wood burning is banned and violators may have to attend a class or pay a fine of up to $500. Exceptions are allowed if a household has a power outage. Barbecues are permitted on a Spare the Air Day, but are discouraged and the use of lower-pollution gas fuels rather than wood or charcoal is recommended.

== Free transportation days ==
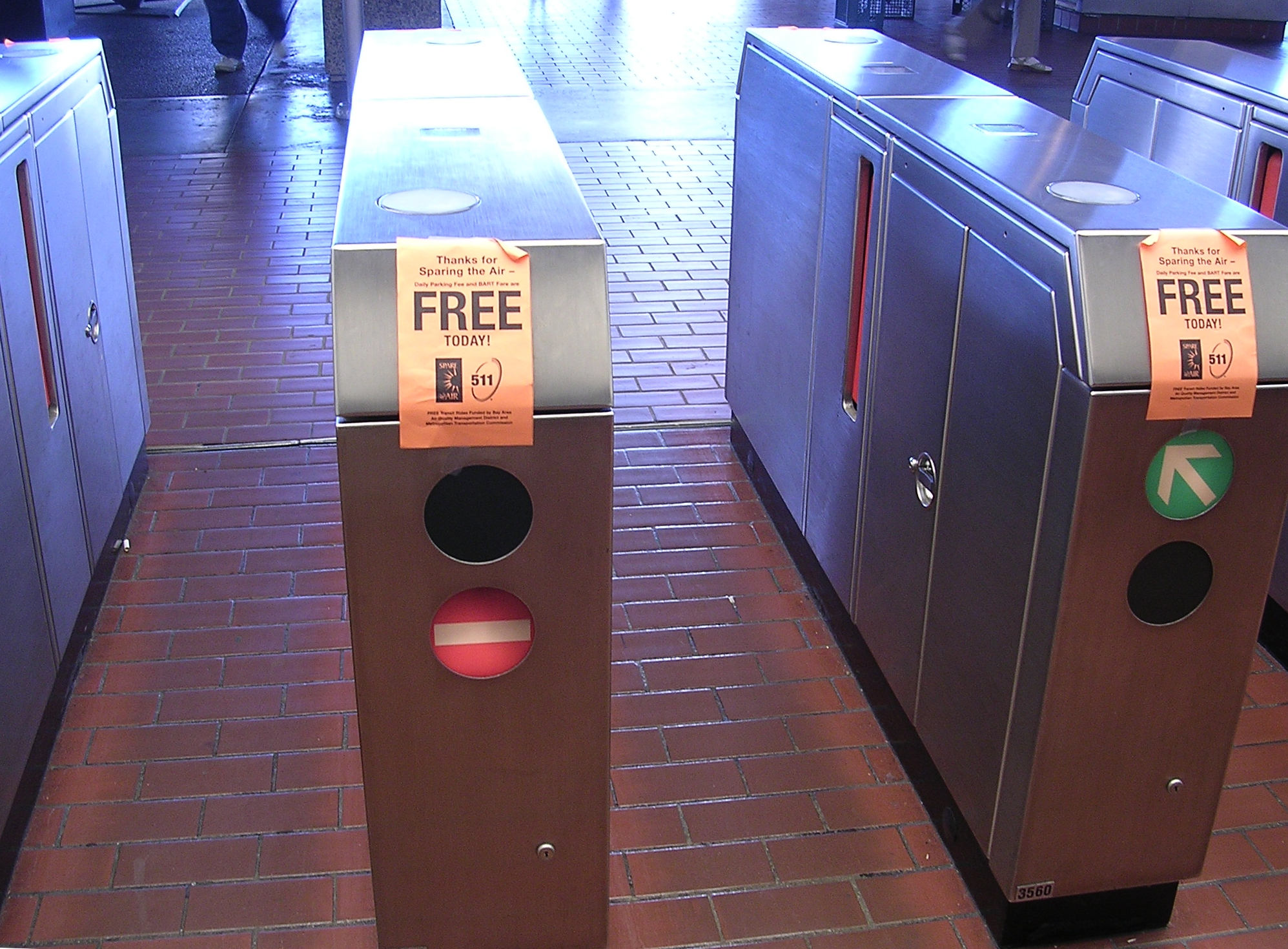
Free BART rides are available on selected Spare the Air days.

Non-compliance with federal air pollution standards can mean losing federal money for transportation projects like wider roads, new bridges, and mass transit. To avoid these penalties, each year for a certain number of Spare the Air days that occur on non-holiday weekdays, many Bay Area transit agencies offer free rides to encourage public transportation use over cars. The number of allocated fare-free days varies from year to year, depending on available funding.

This program's subsidy drew increased media attention in 2006 when the traditional three annual free days jumped to six in response to the number of annual Spare the Air days declared being the highest in seven years.

In past years there have been multiple free transit Spare the Air days. However, in 2008, the number was reduced to only one free transit day, June 19. There has been no free transit program since 2009.

Historically, the following transit providers have participated in the free ride program:

- Altamont Corridor Express (ACE)
- AC Transit
- AirBART
- Alameda Harbor Bay Ferry
- Alameda-Oakland Ferry
- BART
- Benicia Breeze
- Caltrain
- Cloverdale Transit
- County Connection
- Dumbarton Express
- Emery Go-Round (always free)
- Fairfield-Suisun Transit
- Golden Gate Ferry
- Golden Gate Transit
- Napa VINE
- San Francisco Muni
- Petaluma Transit
- Rio Vista Delta Breeze
- SamTrans
- Santa Rosa CityBus
- Sonoma County Transit
- Tri-Delta Transit
- Union City Transit
- Vacaville City Coach
- Vallejo Transit
- VTA
- Napa VINE
- WestCAT
- Wheels

== Criticism of free transportation days ==
The program has drawn criticism for doing little to alleviate pollution. University of California, Berkeley researcher Aaron Golub calculated the cost per ton of pollution removed as a result of Spare the Air was estimated at $100,000 per ton for nitrogen oxide and hydrocarbons and $10 million per ton for particulate matter, compared to $5,000 and $20,000 per ton respectively for a pollution reduction program. The cost for Spare the Air free fares is about $2 million a day, and MTC has claimed that the goal of the program is not reducing air pollution, but rather as an incentive for people to consider public transit. During free rides in 2006, crime on BART increased, with police blaming youths riding for free for fights, assaults, burglaries, and robberies.

Riders of ferries also complained about severe overcrowding, with ferry ridership on the Sausalito ferry experiencing a 500% increase from normal and ridership on the Larkspur ferry increasing by 150% from ridership a week previous.

== See also ==
- Environment of California
