= Public Smog =

Public Smog is an "atmospheric park" created by San Francisco-based artist Amy Balkin and her supporters through the use of financial, political, and legal methods. The goal of Public Smog is to "highlight the complexities and contradictions of current environmental protocols.".

== Overview ==
The public smog atmospheric park consists of two areas which fluctuate in size and location. The upper park opened above the European Union in 2006 and the lower park is located over California’s South Coast Air Quality Management District's Coastal Zone in 2004. Each was opened up through the purchasing of emissions offsets and then retiring the purchased air from use. Both parts of the park are currently closed.

== Methodology ==
Some of the main methods used to create Public Smog are the purchase and withholding of emissions offsets and attempting to add the Earth's atmosphere to UNESCO's World Heritage List.
