= Air basin =

An air basin is a geographical region with commonly shared air masses, such as an area within a ring or partial ring of mountains, in which winds generally mix and stay, although air does pass in and out of basins. It describes a land area with generally similar meteorological and geographic conditions throughout.

California is divided geographically into 15 air basins for the purpose of managing the air resources of the State on a regional basis.
