= Crankcase dilution =

Crankcase dilution is a phenomenon of internal combustion engines in which unburned diesel or gasoline accumulates in the crankcase. Excessively rich fuel mixture or incomplete combustion allows a certain amount of fuel to pass down between the pistons and cylinder walls and dilute the engine oil. It is more common in situations where fuel is injected at a very high pressure, such as in a direct-injected diesel engine.

When a mixture of air and fuel enters the cylinder of an engine, it is entirely possible for condensation of fuel to occur on the cooler parts of the cylinders. The condensate may wash the lubricating oil from the cylinder walls, travel past the piston rings and collect in the oil pan, thus increasing wear and also diluting the lubricating oil. Since the less volatile components of the fuel will have the greatest tendency to condense, the degree of crankcase-oil dilution is directly related to the end volatility temperatures of the mixture.

== Causes ==
Crankcase dilution occurs when the fuel oil from the engine gets into the lube oil of the engine. This can be caused by the walls being wetted due to the fuel condensing in the cylinder. If the engine is cold, or there is an excess amount of cooling around the cylinder, the fuel oil will condense and have a higher chance to end up in the crankcase. Another way that the fuel oil can end up in the crankcase is because there is too much wear on the piston compression rings. The job of the piston compression ring is to keep the oil and the exhaust gases from entering the crankcase, but when there is too much wear it can no longer do its job. Other than the piston rings, “blow-by” gases can push the fuel oil past the rings and into the crankcase. “Blow-by” gases are a mix of fuel oil and exhaust gases that push past the piston rings. Crankcase dilution is caused more when the lube oil is fresher. Another cause of crankcase dilution is a slow or delayed injection cycle. This causes the timing to be thrown off and the oil is most likely to enter the crankcase at this point. Water and dirt can also further the effects of crankcase dilution. Also, soot getting into the lube oil can cause crankcase dilution, but there are additives that can keep the soot at the top of the lube oil. Soot that collects in the crankcase fully goes away when the lube oil is changed out of the engine. Additives can be added to the oil to cause the soot to stay on top of the engine lube oil. These substances getting into the lube oil can accelerate the effects of crankcase dilution.

== Effects ==
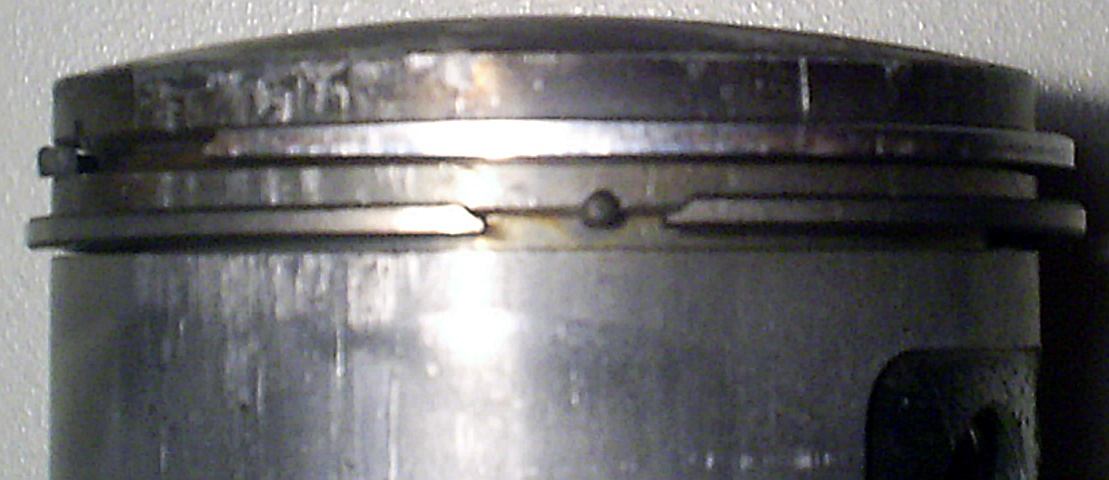
Piston compression ring wear.

Fuel oil in the crankcase lube oil can cause the oil to chemically degrade. This means that the oil loses viscosity and is less effective when lubricating. The loss of viscosity of the lube oil causes the oil to not fully connect and lubricate the moving parts of the engine. This lack of lubrication can cause the engine to have an increased amount of wear over time.

== Reducing Crankcase dilution ==
There are many ways to reduce the amount of crankcase dilution that occurs in an engine. One of the ways is to counteract the loss of viscosity by using a heavier oil. The viscosity that they recommended was 500-575 sec. Another thing that can reduce the effects of crankcase dilution is changing the piston compression rings when they become worn. This would reduce the amount of blow-by gases and overall reducing the effects. Another thing that can be done is to change the car's oil regularly to avoid the wear on your engine from crankcase dilution.

== Detecting Crankcase dilution ==
Detecting crankcase dilution can help reduce the effects that it will have on your engine. There are many ways to detect crankcase dilution. One of the ways is to check the flash point of the oil and compare it to the brand of lube oil. The way to test the flash point of the oil is to manually take a sample and use a testing kit. When the fuel leaks into the lube oil the chemical makeup is different than the normal lube oil. Another way to test for crankcase dilution is to use a SAW to test the concentration of fuel oil in the crankcase oil. SAW stands for surface acoustic wave.

== Biodiesel and crankcase dilution ==
Biodiesel is vegetable oil or animal fats that are mixed with lipids to produce alcohol that can be burned. The alcohol that is produced is the biodiesel. Engines that run on biodiesel have the same problem as regular fuel engines. The biodiesel fuel finds its way into the crankcase of the engine and mixes with the lube oil. When biodiesel leaks into the crankcase, it has more problems than with more traditional fuel. The biodiesel has a higher boiling point than regular fuel and is less likely to evaporate out causing it to stay in the crankcase for a longer period of time. Also, the longer that the biodiesel stays inside of the crankcase, it degrades the organic acids in the lube oil and then reacts with the crankcase wall. After reacting, it causes deposits of the reacted biodiesel in the walls of the crankcase . There are ways that these effects can be reduced. Chevron created additives to reduce the effects of the biodiesel.

== See also ==
- Oil analysis
- Wet stacking
