= Velvex =

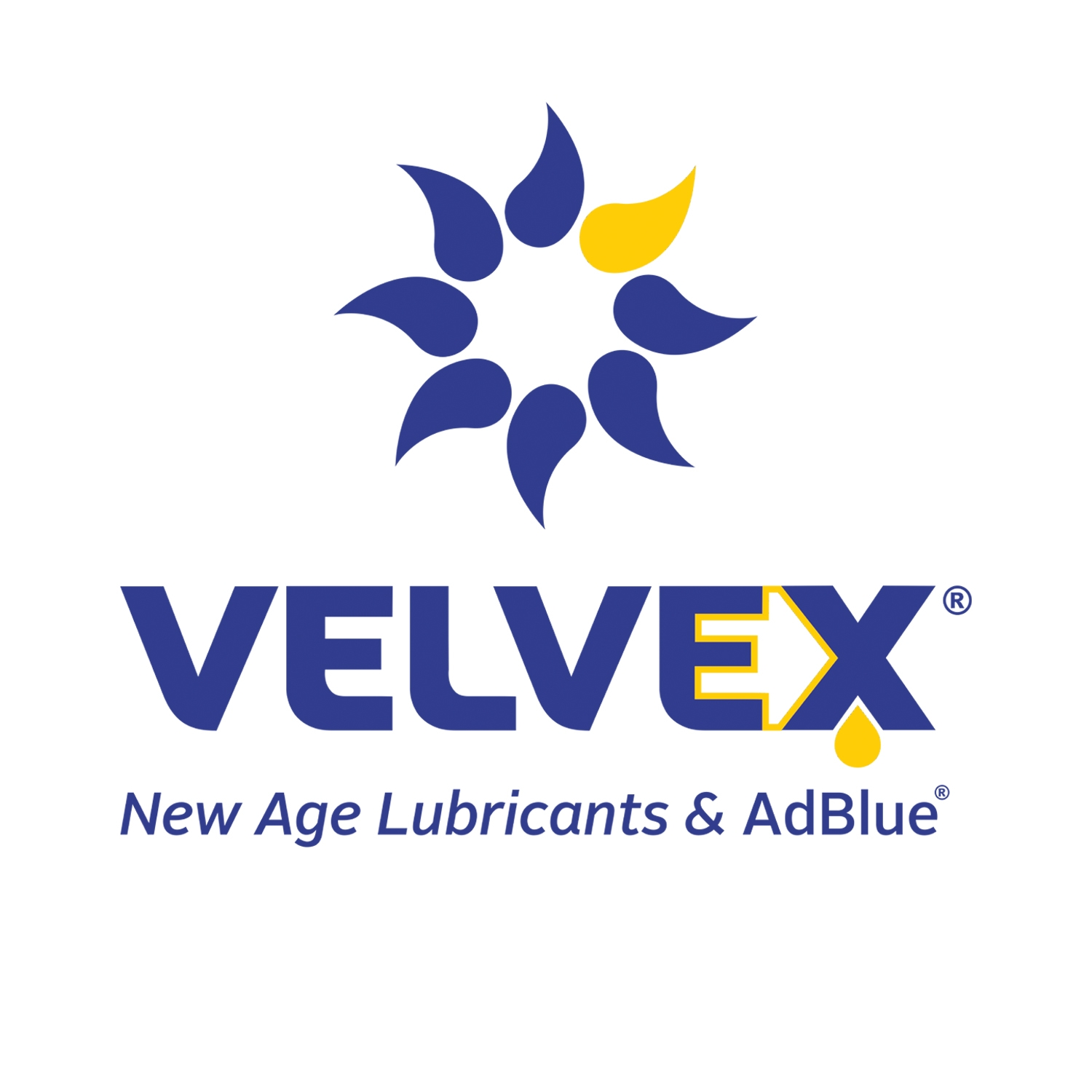
- Company type: Subsidiary
- Genre: Automotive lubricants
- Founded: 2015 in Mumbai, Maharashtra, India
- Headquarters: Mumbai, India
- Products: Automotive lubricants, adBlue
- Production output: Greases, Specialty oils, Genuine oil (OEM solutions)
- Parent: Nandan Petrochem Limited (NPL)
- Website: www.velvex.in

Velvex is an Indian automotive lubricants and adBlue manufacturing company, headquartered in Mumbai.

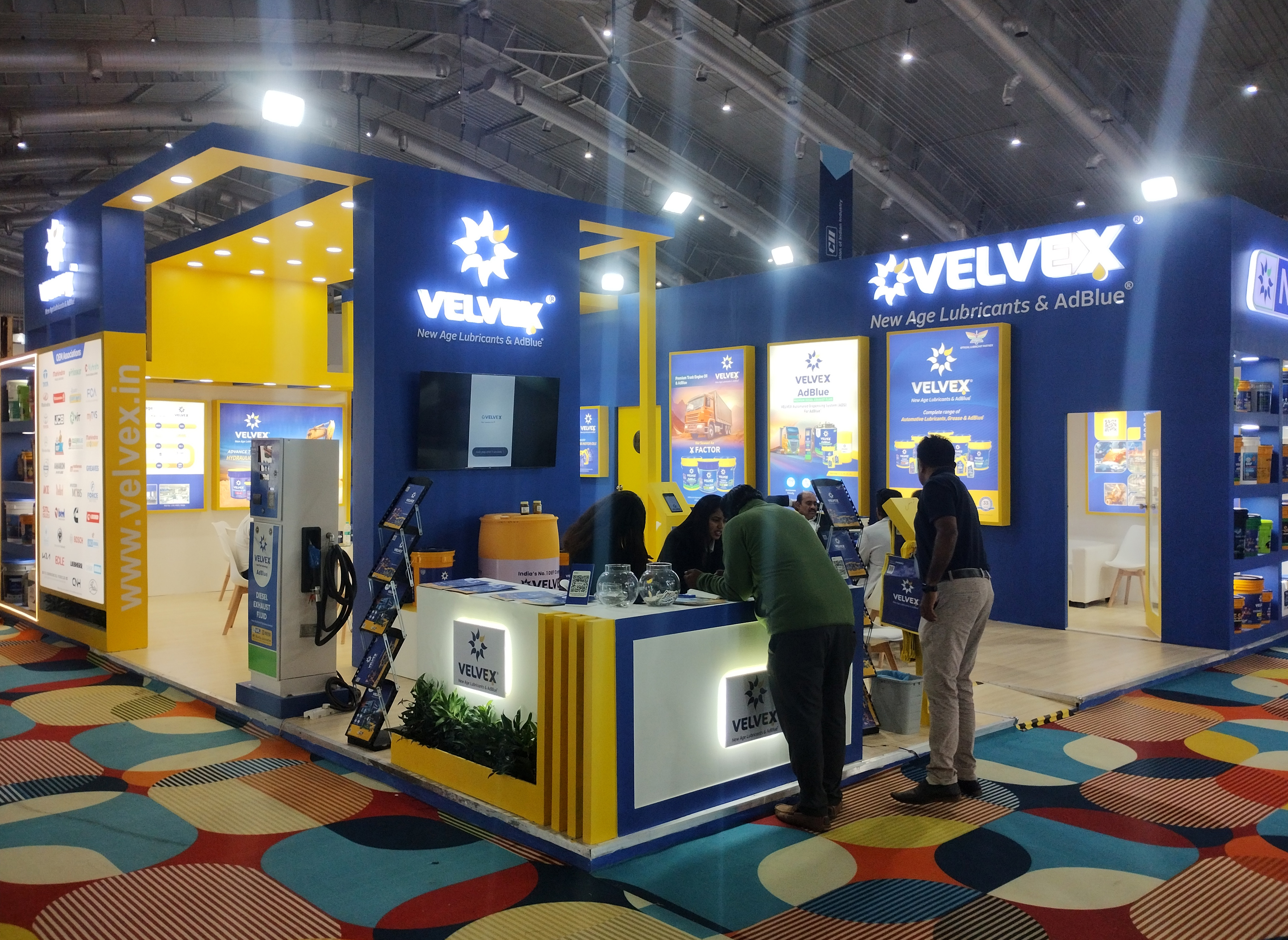
Velvex at EXCON 2025, BIEC
