= Rolling coal =

Modified diesel engines emitting sooty exhaust fumes

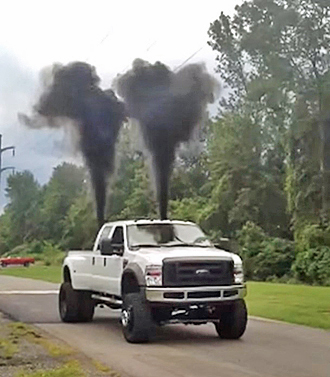
A lifted Ford F-450 "rolling coal" (blowing large clouds of dark gray diesel smoke)

Rolling coal (also spelled rollin' coal) is the practice of modifying a diesel engine to deliberately emit large amounts of black or gray diesel exhaust, containing soot and incompletely combusted fuel. Rolling coal is used as a form of anti-environmentalism protest. In some jurisdictions the practice is illegal, due to it violating clean air laws.

Modifications may include the intentional removal of the particulate filter, installing smoke switches, large exhausts, and smoke stacks. Modifications to a vehicle to enable rolling coal typically cost from US$200 to US$5,000. The modification reduces the fuel economy of the vehicle.

== Terminology ==
Rolling coal (also spelled rollin' coal) is also commonly referred to as coal rolling.

The cultural origins of the practice have been traced to truck pull competitions, where black exhaust smoke was a byproduct of engine modifications made for competitive performance.

== Background ==
Rolling coal is a form of conspicuous air pollution, used in North America for entertainment or as protest. Some drivers intentionally trigger coal rolling in the presence of electric and hybrid vehicles (a practice nicknamed "Prius repellent") to cause their drivers to lose sight of the road and inhale harmful air pollution. Coal rolling may also be directed at foreign vehicles, bicyclists, protesters, and pedestrians. Practitioners cite "American freedom" and a stand against "rampant environmentalism" as reasons for coal rolling.

A concern is road traffic safety violations, as the black smoke impairs visibility, increasing the risks of motor vehicle crashes, and is a violation of clean air laws.

Some incidents have led to injuries. In 2021, six bicyclists training for a road race were run over by a 16-year-old who was rolling coal along Business U.S. Highway 290 in Waller County, Texas, outside Houston, when he attempted to drive ahead of the group to engulf them in the exhaust. Two of the cyclists were injured severely enough to require medical evacuation by helicopter. The motorist was not charged at the time of the collision; local cyclists' groups were outraged. He was later charged with six felony counts of aggravated assault with a deadly weapon.

== Legality ==
=== United States ===
In July 2014, the United States Environmental Protection Agency stated that the practice was illegal, as it violated the Clean Air Act which prohibits the manufacturing, sale, and installation "of a part for a motor vehicle that bypasses, defeats, or renders inoperative any emission control device" and "prohibits anyone from tampering with an emission control device on a motor vehicle by removing it or making it inoperable prior to or after the sale or delivery to the buyer."

The Environmental Protection Agency has made it a "national priority" to erase what it says is "a significant contributor to air pollution." A 2020 EPA report said 15 percent of diesel trucks in the U.S. are rigged to "delete" emissions controls. According to government estimates, the practice can increase nitrogen oxide emissions as much as 310 times, non-methane hydrocarbons 1,400 times, and carbon monoxide 120 times. ... "Businesses that manufacture and sell illegal devices to defeat a vehicle's emissions controls foster pollution and risk decades of progress in curtailing harmful emissions from motor vehicles in this country," said Assistant Attorney General Todd Kim of the Justice Department's Environment and Natural Resources Division.

In 2023, companies in Idaho and California pleaded guilty in federal court to conspiracy to violate the Clean Air Act and agreed to fines of US$1 million each.

=== State law ===
State legislative action
State	Bill	Year	Effective	Notes
Colorado	HB16-1319	2016	N/A	
Colorado	HB17-1102	2017	N/A	
Colorado	SB17-278	2017	June 5, 2017	"A person who violates the prohibition commits a class A traffic infraction, punishable by a fine of $100."
Connecticut	HB-6975	2017	October 1, 2017	"Any person who violates the provisions of this subdivision shall be fined not more than one thousand dollars or imprisoned not more than thirty days, or both."
Connecticut	HB-5871	2019	N/A	"To prevent bias attacks which employ the practice of 'rolling coal' ... any person guilty of intimidation based on bigotry or bias in the fourth degree shall be guilty of a class A misdemeanor."
Idaho	SB1130	2017	N/A	
Illinois	HB3553	2015	N/A	In March 2015, Illinois General Assembly representative Will Guzzardi published a bill proposing to impose a US$5,000 fine on anyone who removes or alters their vehicle's EPA emissions equipment. Guzzardi has made it clear that "The fine would come on top of any penalties enforced by the current law that prohibits emissions tampering."
Maine	2113	2019	2019	Prohibits operating a diesel-powered motor vehicle under 18,000 pounds (8,200 kg) gross weight that emits visible smoke on a public way or parking area because of an alteration to the air pollution control system. Violation is a traffic infraction subject to a penalty not exceeding US$100.
Maryland	HB848	2016	N/A	
Maryland	HB11	2017	October 1, 2017	
Massachusetts	H.3097	2019	N/A	Legislation failed to pass.
New Jersey	SB2418	2014	May 4, 2015	In May 2015, New Jersey Governor Chris Christie signed a bill into law prohibiting the retrofitting of diesel-powered vehicles to increase particulate emissions for the purpose of coal rolling. Those found in violation are subject to a fine by the state's Department of Environmental Protection. The bill was introduced by state Assemblyman Tim Eustace after a pickup truck blasted smoke at Eustace's Nissan Leaf while driving on the New Jersey Turnpike.
New York	S8201	2016	N/A	
New York	S37	2017	N/A	
New York	S38	2019	N/A	
Utah	HB110	2015	May 12, 2015	
Utah	HB171	2018	N/A	
Utah	HB139	2019	N/A	

==== California ====
California law prohibits operating a vehicle "in a manner resulting in the escape of excessive smoke, flame, gas, oil, or fuel residue." The California Highway Patrol or local police can cite a vehicle under this section or others for rolling coal.

==== Colorado ====
Prohibits nuisance exhibition of motor vehicle exhaust, which is the knowing release of soot, smoke, or other particulate emissions from a motor vehicle with a gross vehicle weight rating of 14,000 pounds or less into the air and onto roadways, other motor vehicles, bicyclists, or pedestrians, in a manner that obstructs or obscures another person's view of the roadway, other users of the roadway, or a traffic control device or otherwise creates a hazard to a driver, bicyclist, or pedestrian.

==== Connecticut ====
No person shall operate a motor vehicle in a manner that causes a visual exhibition of smoke that consists of the release of soot, smoke or other particulate emissions to the air and onto roadways, other motor vehicles, bicyclists or pedestrians, with the intent to (a) cause a reasonable person to feel harassed, annoyed or alarmed, (b) obstruct or obscure any person's view of the roadway, other users of the roadway or a traffic control device, or (c) create a hazard to a motor vehicle operator, bicyclist or pedestrian.

==== Indiana ====
"The engine and power mechanism of a motor vehicle must be equipped and adjusted so as to prevent escape of excessive fumes or smoke."

==== Kansas ====
Vehicles must be equipped and adjusted to prevent the escape of excessive fumes or smoke.

==== Maryland ====
A person may not knowingly or intentionally cause a diesel-powered motor vehicle to discharge clearly visible smoke, soot, or other exhaust emissions onto another person or motor vehicle. Normal operations, commercial vehicles of 10,000 pounds or more, and construction site vehicles are exempt.

==== New Jersey ====
No person shall retrofit any diesel-powered vehicle with any device, smoke stack (i.e., hood stack or bed stack), or other equipment which enhances the vehicle's capacity to emit soot, smoke, or other particulate emissions, or shall purposely release significant quantities of soot, smoke, or other particulate emissions into the air and onto roadways and other vehicles while operating the vehicle, colloquially referred to as "coal rolling."

New Jersey Department of Environmental Protection regulations also prohibit "smoking vehicles", and the department has a reporting hotline.

==== North Carolina ====
In 2016, a question to the Western North Carolina Air Quality Director about "rolling coal" referenced state law. Vehicles driven on a highway must have equipment to prevent "annoying smoke and smoke screens." During any mode of operation, diesel-powered vehicles cannot emit for longer than five consecutive seconds visible contaminants darker than a specific density.

==== Texas ====
The Texas Commission on Environmental Quality (TCEQ) decommissioned its state-wide smoking vehicle reporting program. Reports on smoking vehicles can still be made through the North Central Texas Regional Smoking Vehicle Program in the Dallas–Fort Worth area, which includes Collin, Dallas, Denton, Ellis, Erath, Hood, Hunt, Johnson, Kaufman, Navarro, Palo Pinto, Parker, Rockwall, Somervell, Tarrant, and Wise counties.

==== Utah ====
The Department of Motor Vehicles may suspend or revoke a vehicle's registration if notified by a local health department that the vehicle is unable to meet state or local air emissions standards. Except during warmup or heavy tow, or for vehicles with a gross vehicle weight greater than 26,000 pounds, a diesel engine may not emit visible contaminants during operation if manufactured after 2007, or may not emit contaminants greater than a specific density if manufactured before 2008.

An incident of coal rolling on a cyclist was captured on camera in August 2018 and referred to the Kane County attorney. In March 2020, cast members of the Utah-based Diesel Brothers reality television series, and the companies they own, were fined a total of US$850,000 for Clean Air Act violations.

=== County or municipal ordinances and reporting ===
==== Hudson, Colorado ====
It shall be unlawful for any person to engage in a nuisance exhibition of motor vehicle exhaust, which is the knowing release of soot, smoke, or other particulate emissions from a motor vehicle with a gross vehicle weight rating of 14,000 pounds or less into the air and onto roadways, other motor vehicles, bicyclists, or pedestrians, in a manner that obstructs or obscures another person's view of the roadway, other users of the roadways, or a traffic control device or otherwise creates a hazard to a driver, bicyclist, or pedestrian. The ordinance, which was passed in September 2017, exempts several categories of vehicles, and provides for a fine up to US$499.

==== Overland Park, Kansas ====
The engine and power mechanism of every motor vehicle shall be so equipped and adjusted as to prevent the escape of excessive fumes or smoke.

==== Salt Lake, Davis, Utah, Weber/Morgan Counties, Utah ====
These counties have "smoking vehicle" report forms online.

==== Cheyenne, Wyoming ====
A person shall not engage in a nuisance exhibition of motor vehicle exhaust, which is the knowing release of soot, smoke, or other particulate emissions from a motor vehicle with a gross vehicle weight rating of fourteen thousand (14,000) pounds or less into the air and onto roadways, other motor vehicles, bicyclists, or pedestrians, in a manner that obstructs or obscures another person's view of the roadway, other users of the roadway, or a traffic control device, or otherwise creates a hazard to a driver, bicyclist, or pedestrian. The ordinance, which was passed in July 2017, exempts several categories of vehicles and provides for a fine of up to US$750 and up to six months in jail. A first attempt in July 2016 failed, but Cheyenne police had clarified at that time that they had been writing tickets for coal rolling under state law.

=== Canada ===
Provincial legislative action
Province	Bill	Year	Effective	Notes
British Columbia	M 232	2017	N/A	"This Bill would prohibit tampering with emissions control devices in motor vehicles after their sale."
Ontario	Bill 132	2019	December 2019	Schedule 16, Section 11

==== British Columbia ====
"A person who contravenes this section commits an offence and is liable on conviction to a fine of not less than CA$50 and not more than CA$5,000."

==== Ontario ====
Section 75.1 of the Ontario Highway Traffic Act prohibits modifications to a vehicle's emissions systems to increase emissions output exceeding that of the manufacturer's specifications, and modifications which tamper a vehicle's emission control system to bypass, disable or otherwise negate it. Furthermore, Regulation 169/22 restricts the opacity of vehicle emissions and modifications to a vehicle's emissions system. Violations can result in a fine ranging from CA$300 to CA$1,000 for non-commercial vehicles, and CA$400 to CA$20,000 for commercial vehicles.

== See also ==
- Wet stacking, a term for when diesel engines exhaust unburned fuel, whether unintentionally or as part of rolling coal
- Combustion vehicle ban
- Diesel exhaust fluid
