= Diesel exhaust =

Gaseous exhaust produced by a diesel engine

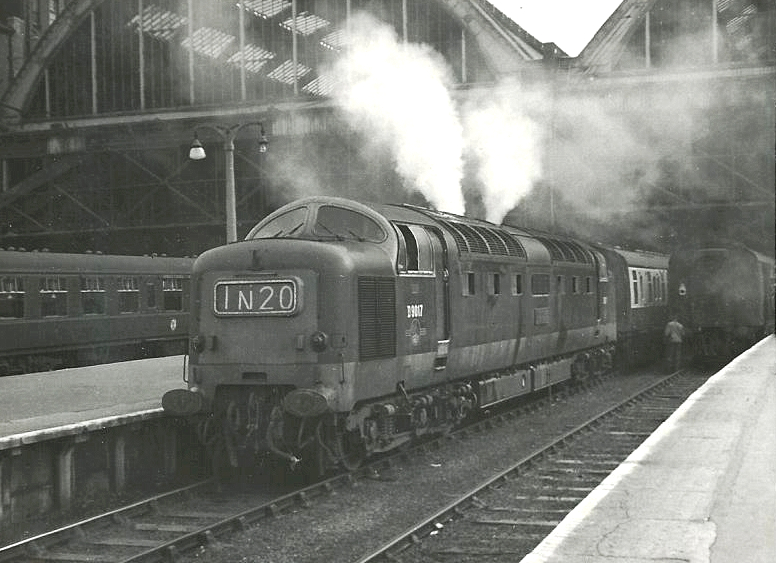
British Rail Class 55 Deltic diesel locomotive with their characteristic dense exhaust when starting a train.

Diesel exhaust is the exhaust gas produced by a diesel engine, plus any contained particulates. Its composition may vary with the fuel type, rate of consumption or speed of engine operation (e.g., idling or at speed or under load), and whether the engine is in an on-road vehicle, farm vehicle, locomotive, marine vessel, or stationary generator or other application.

Diesel exhaust causes lung cancer and other diseases such as asthma, and many premature deaths. Methods exist to reduce nitrogen oxides (NO_{x}) and particulate matter (PM) in the exhaust.

Some countries have set a date to stop selling diesel vehicles, and some city centres will ban diesel cars.

== Composition ==
The primary products of petroleum fuel combustion in air are carbon dioxide and water. The exhaust from this combustion also contains nitrogen and surplus oxygen which passes through the combustion without participating in any chemical reaction. The other components exist primarily from pyrosynthesis. While the distribution of the individual components of raw (untreated) diesel exhaust varies depending on factors like load, engine type, etc., the table below shows a typical composition.

The physical and chemical conditions that exist inside any such diesel engines under any conditions differ considerably from spark-ignition engines, because, by design, diesel engine power is directly controlled by the fuel supply, not by control of the air/fuel mixture, as in conventional gasoline engines. As a result of these differences, diesel engines generally produce a different array of pollutants than spark-ignition engines, differences that are sometimes qualitative (what pollutants are there, and what are not), but more often quantitative (how much of particular pollutants or pollutant classes are present in each). For instance, diesel engines produce one-twenty-eighth the carbon monoxide that gasoline engines do, as they burn their fuel in excess air even at full load.

However, the lean-burning nature of diesel engines and the high temperatures and pressures of the combustion process result in significant production of NO_{x} (gaseous nitrogen oxides), an air pollutant that constitutes a unique challenge with regard to their reduction. While total nitrogen oxides from petrol cars have decreased by around 96% through the adoption of exhaust catalytic converters as of 2012, diesel cars still produce nitrogen oxides at a similar level to those bought 15 years earlier under real-world tests; hence, diesel cars emit around 20 times more nitrogen oxides than petrol cars. Modern on-road diesel engines typically use selective catalytic reduction (SCR) systems to meet emissions laws, as other methods such as exhaust gas recirculation (EGR) cannot adequately reduce NO_{x} to meet the newer standards applicable in many jurisdictions.

Moreover, the fine particles (fine particulate matter) in diesel exhaust (e.g., soot, sometimes visible as opaque dark-colored smoke) has traditionally been of greater concern, as it presents different health concerns and is rarely produced in significant quantities by spark-ignition engines. These especially harmful particulate contaminants are at their peak when such engines are run without sufficient oxygen to fully combust the fuel; when a diesel engine runs at idle, enough oxygen is usually present to burn the fuel completely. From the particle emission standpoint, exhaust from diesel vehicles has been reported to be significantly more harmful than those from petrol vehicles.

Diesel exhausts, long known for their characteristic smells, changed significantly with the reduction of the sulfur content of diesel fuel, and again when catalytic converters were introduced in exhaust systems. Even so, diesel exhausts continue to contain an array of inorganic and organic pollutants, in various classes, and in varying concentrations (see below), depending on fuel composition and engine running conditions.

Diesel engine exhaust compositions
Species	Average (Reif 2014)	Average (Merker, Teichmann, 2014)	Diesel's first engine (Hartenstein, 1895)	(Khair, Majewski, 2006)	(various sources)
Species	Volume percentage			(Volume?) percentage	
Nitrogen (N_{2})	75.2%	72.1%	-	~67 %	-
Oxygen (O_{2})	15%	0.7%	0.5%	~9 %	-
Carbon dioxide (CO_{2})	7.1%	12.3%	12.5%	~12 %	-
Water (H_{2}O)	2.6%	13.8%	-	~11 %	-
Carbon monoxide (CO)	0.043%	0.09%	0.1%	-	100–500 ppm
Nitrogen oxides (NO_{x})	0.034%	0.13%	-	-	50–1000 ppm
Hydrocarbons (HC)	0.005%	0.09%	-	-	-
Aldehyde	0.001%	n/a	-	-	-
Particulate matter (sulfate + solid substances)	0.008%	0.0008%	-	-	1–30 mg·m^{−3}

== Chemical classes ==
The following are classes of chemical compounds that have been found in diesel exhaust.

Class of chemical contaminant	Note
Antimony compounds	Toxicity similar to arsenic poisoning
Beryllium compounds	IARC Group 1 carcinogens
Chromium compounds	IARC Group 3 possible carcinogens
Cobalt compounds	
Cyanide compounds	
Dioxins and dibenzofurans	
Manganese compounds	
Mercury compounds	IARC Group 3 possible carcinogens
Nitrogen oxides	5.6 ppm or 6500 μg/m³
Polycyclic organic matter, including polycyclic aromatic hydrocarbons (PAHs)	
Selenium compounds	
Sulfur compounds	

=== Specific chemicals ===
The following are classes of specific chemicals that have been found in diesel exhaust.

Chemical contaminant	Note	Concentration, ppm
Acetaldehyde	IARC Group 1 carcinogens	
Acrolein	IARC Group 2A probable carcinogens	
Aniline	IARC Group 2A probable carcinogens	
Arsenic	IARC Group 1 carcinogens, endocrine disruptor	
Benzene	IARC Group 1 carcinogens	
Biphenyl	Mild toxicity	
Bis(2-ethylhexyl) phthalate	Endocrine disruptor	
1,3-Butadiene	IARC Group 1 carcinogens	
Cadmium	IARC Group 1 carcinogens, endocrine disruptor	
Chlorine	Byproduct of urea injection	
Chlorobenzene	"[L]ow to moderate" toxicity	
Cresol^{§}		
Dibutyl phthalate	Endocrine disruptor	
1,8-Dinitropyrene	Strongly carcinogenic	
Ethylbenzene		
Formaldehyde	IARC Group 1 carcinogens	
Inorganic lead	Endocrine disruptor	
Methanol		
Methyl ethyl ketone		
Naphthalene	IARC Group 2B carcinogens	
Nickel	IARC Group 2B carcinogens	
3-Nitrobenzanthrone (3-NBA)	Strongly carcinogenic	0.6-6.6
4-Nitrobiphenyl	Irritant, damages nerves/liver/kidneys	2.2
Phenol		
Phosphorus		
Pyrene		3532–8002
Benzo(e)pyrene		487–946
Benzo(a)pyrene	IARC Group 1 carcinogen	208–558
Fluoranthene	IARC Group 3 possible carcinogens	3399–7321
Propionaldehyde		
Styrene	IARC Group 2B carcinogens	
Toluene	IARC Group 3 possible carcinogens	
Xylene^{§}	IARC Group 3 possible carcinogens	

^{§} Includes all regioisomers of this aromatic compound. See ortho-, meta-, and para-isomer descriptions at each compound's article.

== Regulation ==
=== United States ===
To rapidly reduce particulate matter from heavy-duty diesel engines in California, the California Air Resources Board created the Carl Moyer Memorial Air Quality Standards Attainment Program to provide funding for upgrading engines ahead of emissions regulations. In 2008, the California Air Resources Board also implemented the 2008 California Statewide Truck and Bus Rule which requires all heavy-duty diesel trucks and buses, with a few exceptions, that operate in California to either retrofit or replace engines in order to reduce diesel particulate matter.

=== European Union ===
Unlike international shipping, which had a sulfur limit of 3.5% mass/mass outside ECA until 2020, when it reduced to 0.5% outside ECA, diesel for on road use and off-road (heavy equipment) has been limited throughout the EU since 2009.

Diesel and gasoline have been limited to 10 ppm sulfur since 2009 (for on-road vehicles) and 2011 (non-road vehicles). Mandatory specifications also apply to more than a dozen fuel parameters.

== Health damage ==
=== Damage to public health ===
Emissions from diesel vehicles are more harmful than those from petrol vehicles. Diesel combustion exhaust is a source of atmospheric soot and fine particles, which is a component of the air pollution implicated in human cancer, heart and lung damage, and mental functioning. Moreover, diesel exhaust contains contaminants listed as carcinogenic for humans by the IARC (part of the World Health Organization of the United Nations), as present in their List of IARC Group 1 carcinogens.

Diesel exhaust is a Group 1 carcinogen, which causes lung cancer and has a positive association with bladder cancer. It contains several substances that are also listed individually as human carcinogens by the IARC.

A March 2025 report from the Centre for Research on Energy and Clean Air (CREA) reveals that the impact of diesel trucks is more harmful to public health than previously believed. CREA assessed the impacts of nitrogen oxide (NOX) emissions from medium and heavy-duty trucks manufactured and sold by Daimler, Traton, Volvo, and Paccar between 2014–2023. The analysis predicts that, through 2040, there could be 307,000 premature deaths, 217,000 new childhood asthma cases, 120 million lost workdays, and $1.4 trillion in economic costs linked to diesel truck emissions.

=== Occupational health effects ===
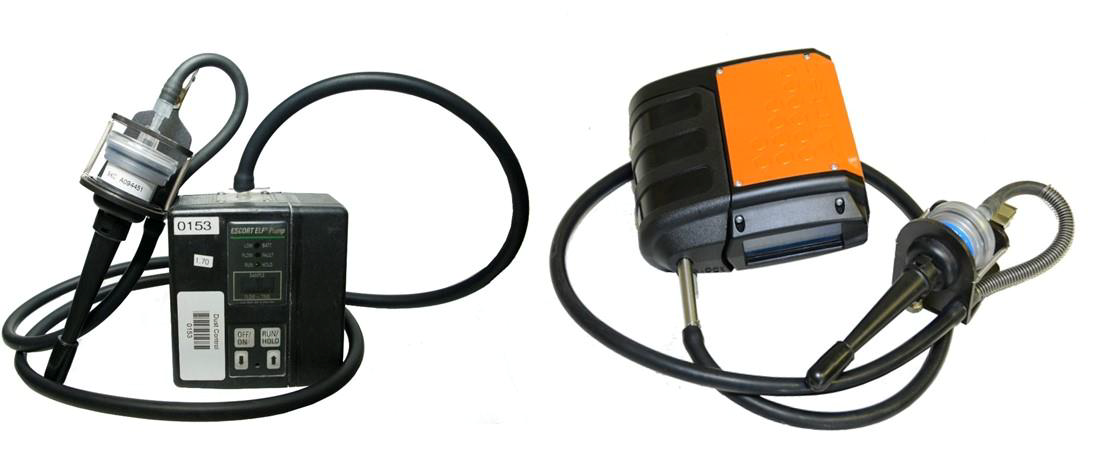
Two diesel particulate matter monitors.

Exposure to diesel exhaust and diesel particulate matter (DPM) is an occupational hazard to truckers, railroad workers, occupants of residential homes in the vicinity of a rail yard, and miners using diesel-powered equipment in underground mines. Adverse health effects have also been observed in the general population at ambient atmospheric particle concentrations well below the concentrations in occupational settings.

In March 2012, U.S. government scientists showed that underground miners exposed to high levels of diesel fumes have a threefold increased risk for contracting lung cancer compared with those exposed to low levels. The $11.5 million Diesel Exhaust in Miners Study (DEMS) followed 12,315 miners, controlling for key carcinogens such as cigarette smoke, radon, and asbestos. This allowed scientists to isolate the effects of diesel fumes.

For over 10 years, concerns have been raised in the US regarding children's exposure to DPM as they ride diesel-powered school buses to and from school. In 2013, the Environmental Protection Agency (EPA) established the Clean School Bus USA initiative in an effort to unite private and public organizations in curbing student exposures.

=== Due to particulates ===
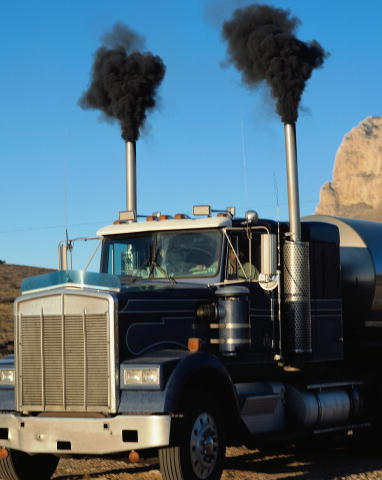
Heavy truck, with visible particulate soot.

Diesel particulate matter (DPM), sometimes also called diesel exhaust particles (DEP), is the particulate component of diesel exhaust, which includes diesel soot and aerosols such as ash particulates, metallic abrasion particles, sulfates, and silicates. When released into the atmosphere, DPM can take the form of individual particles or chain aggregates, with most in the invisible sub-micrometer range of 100 nanometers, also known as ultrafine particles (UFP) or PM0.1.

The main particulate fraction of diesel exhaust consists of fine particles. Because of their small size, inhaled particles may easily penetrate deep into the lungs. The polycyclic aromatic hydrocarbons (PAHs) in the exhaust stimulate nerves in the lungs, causing reflex coughing, wheezing and shortness of breath. The rough surfaces of these particles makes it easy for them to bind with other toxins in the environment, thus increasing the hazards of particle inhalation.

A study of particulate matter (PM) emissions from transit buses running on ULSD and a mixture of biodiesel and conventional diesel (B20) was reported by Omidvarborna and coworkers, where they concluded that PM emissions appeared lower in cases of mixed diesel/biodiesel use, where they were dependent on the engine model, cold and hot idle modes, and fuel type, and that heavy metals in PM emitted during hot idling were greater than those from cold idling; reasons for PM reduction in biodiesel emissions were suggested to result from the oxygenated structure of biodiesel fuel, as well as arising from changes in technology (including the use of a catalytic converter in this test system). Other studies concluded that while in certain specific cases (i.e. low loads, more saturated feedstocks, ...), NO_{x} emissions can be lower than with diesel fuel, in most cases NO_{x} emissions are higher, and the NO_{x} emissions even go up as more biofuel is mixed in. Pure biodiesel (B100) even ends up having 10-30% more NO_{x} emissions compared to regular diesel fuel.

=== Specific effects ===
Exposures have been linked with acute short-term symptoms such as headache, dizziness, light-headedness, nausea, coughing, difficult or labored breathing, tightness of chest, and irritation of the eyes, nose, and throat. Long-term exposures can lead to chronic, more serious health problems such as cardiovascular disease, cardiopulmonary disease, and lung cancer. Elemental carbon attributable to traffic was significantly associated with wheezing at age 1 and persistent wheezing at age 3 in the Cincinnati Childhood Allergy and Air Pollution Study birth cohort study. Ambient traffic-related air pollution is associated with decreased cognitive function in older men.

The study of nanoparticles and nanotoxicology is in its infancy, and health effects from nanoparticles produced by all types of diesel engines are still being uncovered. It is clear, that diesel health detriments of fine particle emissions are severe and pervasive. Although one study found no significant evidence that short-term exposure to diesel exhaust results in adverse extrapulmonary effects, effects that are correlated with an increase in cardiovascular disease, a 2011 study in The Lancet concluded that traffic exposure is the single most serious preventable trigger of heart attack in the general public, as the cause of 7.4% of all attacks. It is not possible to tell how much of this effect is due to the stress of being in traffic and how much is due to exposure to exhaust.

Since the study of the detrimental health effects of nanoparticles (nanotoxicology) is still in its infancy, and the nature and extent of negative health impacts from diesel exhaust continues to be discovered, it remains controversial whether the public health impact of diesels is higher than that of petrol-fueled vehicles.

=== Variation with engine conditions ===
The types and quantities of nanoparticles can vary according to operating temperatures and pressures, the presence of an open flame, fundamental fuel type and fuel mixture, and even atmospheric mixtures. As such, the resulting types of nanoparticles from different engine technologies and even different fuels are not necessarily comparable. One study has shown that 95% of the volatile component of diesel nanoparticles is unburned lubricating oil. Long-term effects still need to be further clarified, as well as the effects on susceptible groups of people with cardiopulmonary diseases.

Diesel engines can produce black soot (or more specifically diesel particulate matter) from their exhaust. The black smoke consists of carbon compounds that have not burned because of local low temperatures where the fuel is not fully atomized. These local low temperatures occur at the cylinder walls, and at the surface of large droplets of fuel. At these areas where it is relatively cold, the mixture is rich (contrary to the overall mixture which is lean). The rich mixture has less air to burn and some of the fuel turns into a carbon deposit. Modern car engines use a diesel particulate filter (DPF) to capture carbon particles and then intermittently burn them using extra fuel injected directly into the filter. This prevents carbon buildup at the expense of wasting a small quantity of fuel.

When starting from cold, the engine's combustion efficiency is reduced because the cold engine block draws heat out of the cylinder in the compression stroke. The result is that fuel is not burned fully, resulting in blue and white smoke and lower power outputs until the engine has warmed. This is especially the case with indirect injection engines, which are less thermally efficient. With electronic injection, the timing and length of the injection sequence can be altered to compensate for this. Older engines with mechanical injection can have mechanical and hydraulic governor control to alter the timing, and multi-phase electrically controlled glow plugs, that stay on for a period after start-up to ensure clean combustion; the plugs are automatically switched to a lower power to prevent their burning out.

Wärtsilä states that there are two ways of forming smoke, on large diesel engines, one being fuel hitting metal and not having time to burn off. The other being, when too much fuel is in the combustion chamber.

Wärtsilä have tested an engine and compared smoke-output, when using conventional fuel system and common rail fuel system, the result shows improvement on all operation conditions when using the common rail system.

== Ecological effects ==
Experiments in 2013 showed that diesel exhaust impaired bees' ability to detect the scent of oilseed rape flowers.

Emissions from diesel engines contribute to the production of ground-level ozone, which can damage crops, trees, and other vegetation. Diesel exhaust also contributes to the formation of acid rain, which affects soil, lakes, and streams, and can enter the human food chain via water, produce, meat, and fish.

Diesel exhaust plays a role in climate change. Reducing greenhouse gas (GHG) emissions from diesel engines through improved fuel economy or idle reduction strategies can help address climate change, improve energy security, and strengthen the economies of countries. While diesel fuel contains slightly more carbon (2.68 kg CO_{2}/litre) than petrol (2.31 kg CO_{2}/litre), overall, the CO_{2} emissions of a diesel car tend to be lower due to higher efficiency. In use, on average, this equates to around 200 g CO_{2}/km for petrol and 120 g CO_{2}/km for diesel.

== Remedies ==
=== General ===
With emission standards tightening, diesel engines are having to become more efficient and have fewer pollutants in their exhaust. Moreover, in recent years the United States, Europe, and Japan have extended emissions control regulations from covering on-road vehicles to include farm vehicles and locomotives, marine vessels, and stationary generator applications. Changing to a different fuel (i.e. dimethyl ether, and other bioethers as diethyl ether) tends to be a very effective means to reduce pollutants such as NO_{x} and CO. When running on dimethyl ether (DME) for instance, particulate matter emissions are near-nonexistent, and the use of diesel particulate filters could even be omitted. Also, given that DME can be made from animal, food, and agricultural waste, it can even be carbon-neutral (unlike regular diesel). Mixing in bio ether (or other fuels such as hydrogen) into conventional diesel also tends to have a beneficial effect on the pollutants that are emitted. In addition to changing the fuel, US engineers have also come up with two other principles and distinct systems to all on-market products that meet the U.S. 2010 emissions criteria, selective non-catalytic reduction (SNCR), and exhaust gas recirculation (EGR). Both are in the exhaust system of diesel engines, and are further designed to promote efficiency.

=== Selective catalytic reduction ===
Selective catalytic reduction (SCR) injects a reductant such as ammonia or urea — the latter aqueous, where it is known as diesel exhaust fluid (DEF) — into the exhaust of a diesel engine to convert nitrogen oxides (NO_{x}) into gaseous nitrogen and water. SNCR systems have been prototyped that reduce 90% of the NO_{x} in the exhaust system, with commercialized systems being somewhat lower. SCR systems do not necessarily need particulate matter (PM) filters; when SNCR and PM filters are combined, some engines have been shown to be 3-5% more fuel efficient. A disadvantage of the SCR system, in addition to added upfront development cost (which can be offset by compliance and improved performance), is the need to refill the reductant, the periodicity of which varies with the miles driven, load factors, and the hours used. The SNCR system is not as efficient at higher revolutions per minute (rpm). SCR is being optimized to have higher efficiency with broader temperatures, to be more durable, and to meet other commercial needs.

=== Exhaust gas recirculation ===
Exhaust gas recirculation (EGR), on diesel engines, can be used to achieve a richer fuel to air mixture and a lower peak combustion temperature. Both effects reduce NO_{x} emissions, but can negatively impact efficiency and the production of soot particles. The richer mix is achieved by displacing some of the intake air, but is still lean compared to petrol engines, which approach the stoichiometric ideal. The lower peak temperature is achieved by a heat exchanger that removes heat before re-entering the engine, and works due to the exhaust gases' higher specific heat capacity than air. With the greater soot production, EGR is often combined with a particulate matter (PM) filter in the exhaust. In turbocharged engines, EGR needs a controlled pressure differential across the exhaust manifold and intake manifold, which can be met by such engineering as use of a variable geometry turbocharger, which has inlet guide vanes on the turbine to build exhaust backpressure in the exhaust manifold directing exhaust gas to the intake manifold. It also requires additional external piping and valving, and so requires additional maintenance.

=== Combined systems ===
John Deere, the farm equipment manufacturer, is implementing a combined SCR-EGR design, in a 9-liter "inline 6" diesel engine that involves both system types, a PM filter and additional oxidation catalyst technologies. The combined system incorporates two turbochargers, the first on the exhaust manifold, with variable geometry and containing the EGR system; and a second a fixed geometry turbocharger. Recirculated exhaust gas and the compressed air from the turbochargers have separate coolers, and air merges before entering the intake manifold, and all subsystems are controlled by a central engine control unit that optimizes minimization of pollutants released in the exhaust gas.

=== Other remedies ===
A new technology being tested in 2016 has been created by Air Ink which collects carbon particles using a "Kaalink" cylindrical device that is retrofitted into a vehicle's exhaust system, after processing to remove heavy metals and carcinogens, the company plans to use the carbon to make ink.

In India, the Chakr Dual Fuel Kit retrofits a diesel generator set to operate on a mixture of both gas and diesel, with 70% natural gas and 30% fossil fuel.

=== Water recovery ===
There has been research into ways that troops in deserts can recover drinkable water from their vehicles' exhaust gases.

== See also ==
- Carl Moyer Memorial Air Quality Standards Attainment Program
- List of IARC Group 1 carcinogens
- List of IARC Group 2A carcinogens
- List of IARC Group 2B carcinogens
- List of IARC Group 3 possible carcinogens
- National Emissions Standards for Hazardous Air Pollutants
- Rolling coal - intentional creation of conspicuous excessive diesel exhaust
- Vehicle emissions control
- Volkswagen emissions scandal
