= Diesel exhaust fluid =

Chemical which reduces air pollution from diesel engines

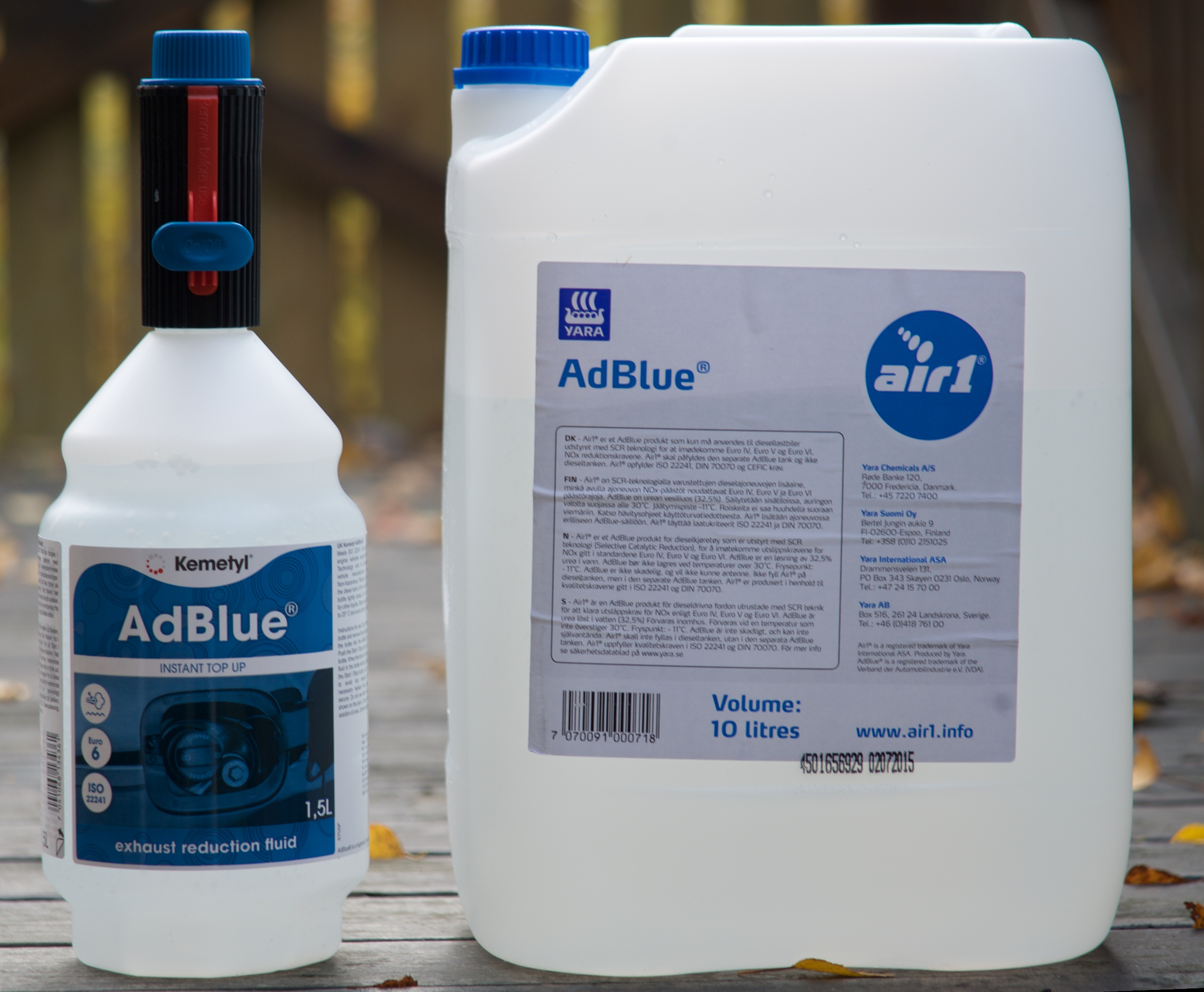
A 1.5-liter and a 10-liter AdBlue container

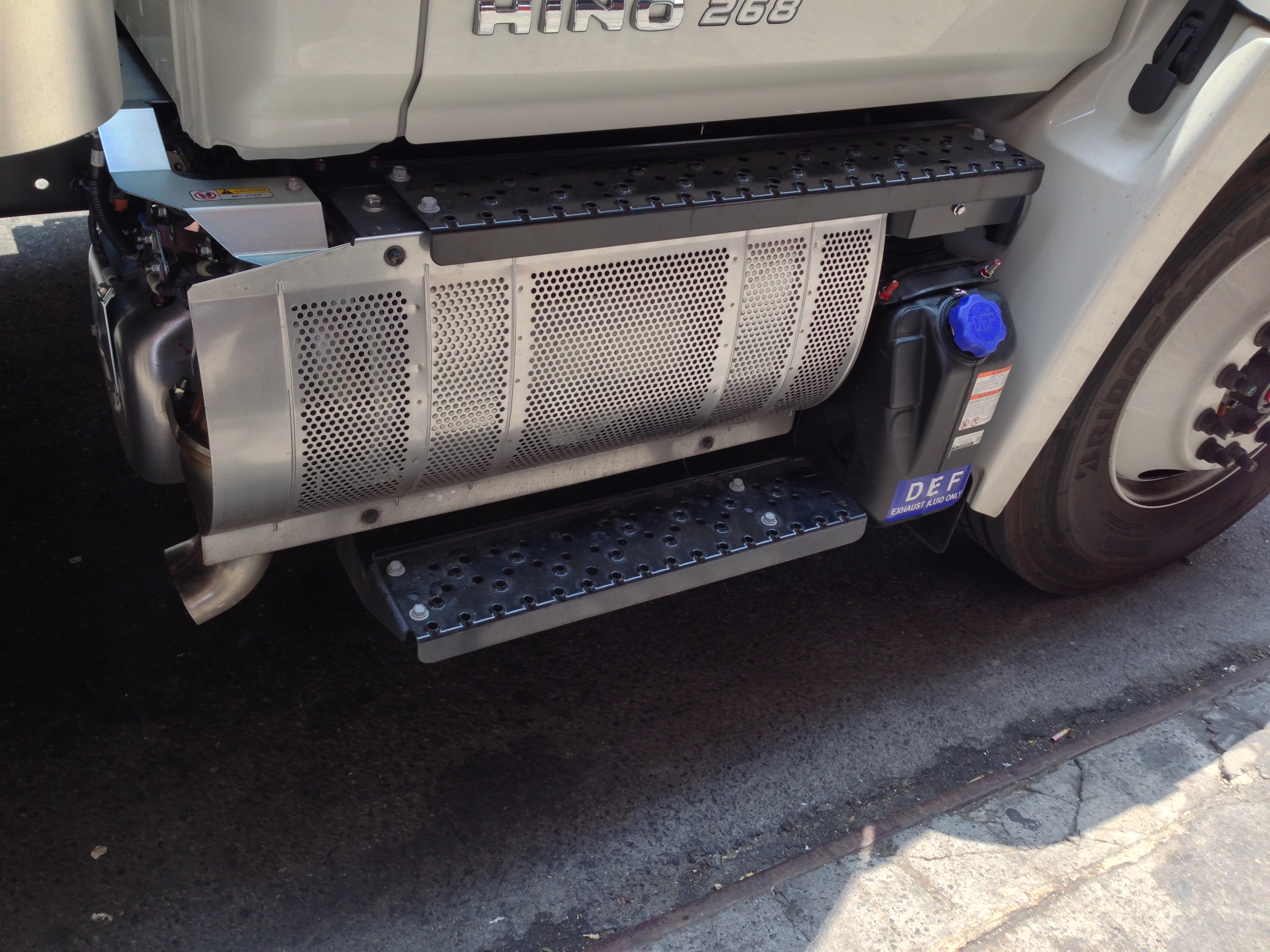
Hino truck and its SCR next to the diesel particulate filter (DPF) with regeneration process by the late fuel injection to control exhaust temperature to burn off soot

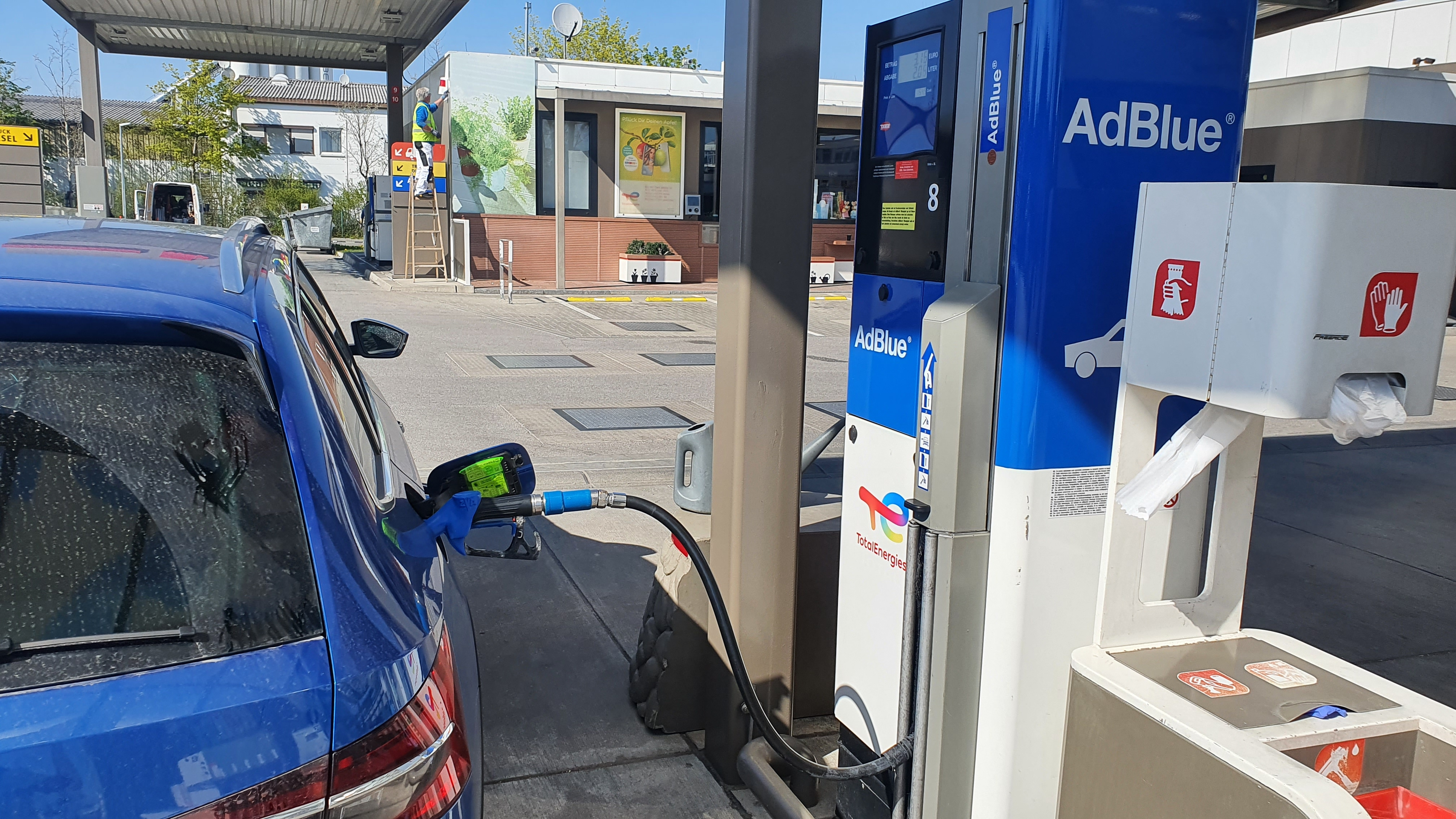
Passenger car using an AdBlue pump

Diesel exhaust fluid (DEF; also known as AUS 32 and sometimes marketed as AdBlue) is a liquid used to reduce the amount of air pollution created by a diesel engine. Specifically, DEF is an aqueous urea solution made with 32.5% urea and 67.5% deionized water. DEF is consumed in a selective catalytic reduction (SCR) that lowers the concentration of nitrogen oxides (NO_{x}) in the diesel exhaust emissions from a diesel engine.

== Other names ==
In the international standard defining DEF (ISO 22241), it is referred to as AUS 32 (aqueous urea solution 32%). DEF is also sold as AdBlue, a registered trademark of the German Association of the Automotive Industry.

Several brands of SCR systems use DEF: BlueHDI is used by PSA Group vehicles including Peugeot, Citroën, and DS Automobiles brands; BlueTec by Daimler AG; and FLENDS (Final Low Emission New Diesel System) by UD Trucks. Blue Sky DEF is made and distributed for retail sale by Prime Lubes, Inc.

== Background ==
Diesel engines are typically operated with a lean burn air-to-fuel ratio (over-stoichiometric ratio) to ensure the full combustion of soot and to prevent them from exhausting unburnt fuel. The excess air leads to the generation of nitrogen oxide NO_{x}, which is a harmful pollutant, from nitrogen in the atmosphere. SCR is used to reduce the amount of NO_{x} released into the atmosphere. DEF from a separate tank is injected into the exhaust pipeline, and the exhaust heat decomposes it to ammonia. Within the SCR catalyst, the NO_{x} are reduced by the ammonia into water and nitrogen, which are both nonpolluting. The water and nitrogen are then released into the atmosphere through the exhaust.

SCR was applied to automobiles by Nissan Diesel Corporation, and the first practical product "Nissan Diesel Quon" was introduced in 2004. With the cooperation of the oil and chemical industry, a 1,300-station infrastructure to supply DEF was prepared by September 2005 in Japan.

In 2007, the United States Environmental Protection Agency (EPA) enacted requirements to significantly reduce harmful exhaust emissions. To achieve this standard, Cummins and other diesel engine manufacturers developed an aftertreatment system that includes the use of a diesel particulate filter (DPF).

As the DPF does not function with low-sulfur diesel fuel, diesel engines that conform to 2007 EPA emissions standards require ultra-low-sulfur diesel (ULSD) fuel to prevent damage to the DPF. After a brief transition period, ULSD fuel became common at fuel pumps in the United States and Canada.

The 2007 EPA regulations were meant to be an interim solution to allow manufacturers time to prepare for the more stringent 2010 EPA regulations, which reduced NO_{x} levels even further. In 2008, the concerns about compliance shifted to the infrastructure for DEF distribution.

The injection rate of DEF into the exhaust depends on the specific after-treatment system, but is typically 2–6% of diesel consumption volume. This low dosing rate ensures long fluid refill intervals and minimizes the tank's size and intrusion into vehicle packaging space. An electronic control unit adjusts the addition of fluid in accordance with parameters such as NO_{x} level in the exhaust gas (before catalytic converter, after catalytic converter, and possibly between catalytic converters if there is more than one), current ammonia filling level, engine operating temperature and speed.

== Chemistry ==
DEF is a 32.5% solution of urea, (NH_{2})_{2}CO. When it is injected into the hot exhaust gas stream, the water evaporates and the urea thermally decomposes to form ammonia (NH_{3}) and isocyanic acid (HNCO):

(NH_{2})_{2}CO → NH_{3} + HNCO

The isocyanic acid reacts with the water vapor and hydrolyses to carbon dioxide and ammonia:

HNCO + H_{2}O → CO_{2} + NH_{3}

Overall, thus far:

(NH_{2})_{2}CO + H_{2}O → 2 NH_{3} + CO_{2}

Ammonia, in the presence of oxygen and a catalyst, reduces two different nitrogen oxides:

4 NO + 4 NH_{3} + O_{2} → 4 N_{2} + 6 H_{2}O ("standard SCR") and
6 NO_{2} + 8 NH_{3} → 7 N_{2} + 12 H_{2}O ("NO_{2} SCR selective catalytic reduction")
NO + NO_{2} + 2 NH_{3} → 2 N_{2} + 3 H_{2}O ("fast SCR")

The overall reduction of NO_{x} by urea is then:

2 (NH_{2})_{2}CO + 4 NO + O_{2} → 4 N_{2} + 4 H_{2}O + 2 CO_{2} and
4 (NH_{2})_{2}CO + 6 NO_{2} → 7 N_{2} + 8 H_{2}O + 4 CO_{2} and
(NH_{2})_{2}CO + NO + NO_{2} → 2 N_{2} + 2 H_{2}O + CO_{2}

The ratio between NO_{2} and NO determines which reactions take place and how fast. The highest conversion rates are achieved if equal amounts of NO_{2} and NO are present, especially at temperatures between 200 °C and 350 °C. If there is more NO than NO_{2}, fast SCR and standard SCR take place sequentially. If there is more NO_{2} than NO, fast SCR and NO_{2} SCR take place sequentially, however, NO_{2} SCR is slower than standard SCR, and ammonium nitrate can form and temporarily deactivate the catalytic converter.

== Operation in winter time ==
DEF freezes at −11 °C (12 °F). For the SCR exhaust cleaning system to function at low temperatures, a sufficient amount of the frozen DEF must be melted in as short time as possible, preferably in the order of minutes. For example, 2010 EPA emissions requirements require full DEF coolant flow within 70 minutes.

In Europe, Regulation (EC) No 692/2008 specified in Annex XVI point 10 that DEF from a frozen tank at a core temperature of −15 °C (5 °F) must become available within 20 minutes when starting the engine at −15 °C (5 °F).

Typically, the frozen DEF is melted by heat from the engine, e.g. engine coolant passing through the DEF tank, governed by a thermostatic coolant control valve. This method may take significant time before the SCR exhaust cleaning system is fully operational, often up to an hour.

Another method to thaw DEF (and thus allow for full SCR operation) is to integrate an electric heater into the DEF tank. This heater must be sized, positioned, and powered adequately to rapidly melt sufficient frozen DEF. It should preferably be self regulating not to overheat if (part of) the heater is outside of the liquid. It should also preferably be self regulating to eliminate any complicated sensor and temperature regulating systems. Furthermore, the heater should not exceed 50–60 °C (122–140 °F), as DEF begins to decompose at around 60 °C (140 °F). PTC heaters are often used to achieve this.

== Safety and storage ==
The urea solution is clear, non-toxic and safe to handle. Since urea has corrosive impact on metals like aluminium, DEF is stored and transported in special containers. These containers are typically made of stainless steel. Vehicles' selective catalytic reduction (SCR) systems and DEF dispensers are designed in a manner that there is no corrosive impact of urea on them. It is recommended that DEF be stored in a cool, dry, and well-ventilated area that is out of direct sunlight. Bulk volumes of DEF are compatible for storage within polyethylene containers (HDPE, XLPE), fiberglass reinforced plastic (FRP), and steel tanks. DEF is also often handled in intermediate bulk containers for storage and shipping.

DEF is offered to consumers in a variety of quantities ranging from containers for single or repeated small usage, up to bulk carriers for consumers requiring a large amount of DEF. As of 2013, many truck stops have added DEF pumps. These are usually adjacent to fuel pumps so the driver can fill both tanks without moving the truck.

In Europe, increasing numbers of fuel stations offer dispensers that pump Diesel Exhaust Fluid rather than the traditional method of using disposable, single-use plastic containers. These pumped dispensers are often targeted at commercial vehicles but are now also starting to emerge as a solution for the growing number of passenger cars that require DEF by volume.

At airports, where DEF can sometimes be required for diesel ground service vehicles, its labelling and storage must be carefully managed to avoid accidentally servicing jet aircraft with DEF instead of fuel system icing inhibitor, a mistake that has been blamed for multiple in-flight engine failure and grounding incidents.

== Supply shortage ==
=== Australia ===
In early December 2021, the Australian National Road Transport Association also raised concerns about a shortage of DEF in the country due to the shortage of urea in China. China capped exports to protect its domestic supplies and rising DEF prices. By mid-December, there was approximately 7 weeks' supply of AdBlue left in Australia. On 14 December, Australian company IOR stated that it would build a new plant.

=== South Korea ===
As of December 2021, South Korea was facing a severe shortage of DEF, which was causing significant disruption to its economy. The crisis began after China introduced mandatory inspections on urea exports in September, slowing shipments of the key raw material. Between January and September, nearly 97% of South Korea’s urea imports came from China. The shortage was particularly damaging because, since 2015, the country has required all new diesel vehicles to use urea-based solutions in SCR systems to control emissions—a rule that now affects about 40% of registered vehicles. As panic buying spread, the South Korean government began rationing DEF supplies and banned resale in an effort to prevent hoarding and keep transport and industry operating. To ease the shortage, a KC-330 Cygnus transport aircraft was dispatched to Australia to secure additional DEF supplies.

== See also ==
- Combustion vehicle ban
- Rolling coal
- Wet stacking, a term for when diesel engines exhaust unburned fuel, whether unintentionally or as part of rolling coal
