= Air-Ink =

Brand of ink

AIR-INK
- Type: Private
- Industry: Material Science, Industrial inks
- Founded: 2016
- Founder: MIT Media Lab
- Headquarters: Cambridge, U.S.
- Key people: Anirudh Sharma, Nikhil Kaushik,
- Products: 'Kaalink,' Pens, industrial inks, spray paints, markers
- Website: www.graviky.com

AIR-INK is a proprietary brand of ink and composites products made by condensing carbon-based gaseous effluents generated by air pollution due to incomplete combustion of fossil fuels. Founded by Graviky Labs, a spin-off group of MIT Media Lab, AIR-INK produces its materials through a step-by-step process which primarily involves capturing of emissions, separation of carbon from the emissions, and then mixing of this carbon with different types of oils and solutions to achieve advanced material properties. It uses a patented device and technique called 'KAALINK' to carry out the filtration of soot, which contains carbon and other polluting agents like heavy metals and polycyclic aromatic hydrocarbon.

AIR-INK is marketed as a solution to air pollution and its negative effects on human life, by allowing the print industry to offset its carbon. Dubbed as "the first ink made out of recycled air pollution," its products were used in June 2016 in association with Heineken to create street art and murals in Hong Kong's Sheung Wan district. 30–50 minutes of car pollution can supply enough carbon to fill one AIR-INK pen.

== History ==
Anirudh Sharma, the founder of Graviky Labs, first conceived the idea of AIR-INK during an experiment at MIT, while designing a printer that could print with carbon nanoparticles. Sharma and his team spent close to three years researching how to purify and repurpose carbon soot from auto and factory emissions, a major contributor to air pollution and global carbon footprint. In 2013, the Fluid Interfaces research group, at the Massachusetts Institute of Technology demonstrated the process of converting carbon residue into ink for use in an inkjet cartridge.

In 2016, AIR-INK products were given to graphic artists in Hong Kong, which is known for its high air pollution, who were requested to paint murals. An artist who participated in this campaign said of the product, "genius, and deserves a chance."

== Technology ==
Soot composed of 2.5-micrometer black carbon particles found in petrol or diesel carbon emissions is captured from the tailpipes of cars and diesel generators through a device called 'Kaalink.' A separate ensures that carbon particulate is recycled into safe inks without heavy metals/toxins A single Air Ink pen contains 30–50 minutes of air pollution. The emissions from 2,500 hours of driving one standard diesel vehicle produces about 150 litres of ink.

=== 'Kaalink' ===
Kaalink is a cylindrical device that is retrofitted into a diesel generators' exhaust system or exhaust pipe to collect the emissions. It can collect up to 93% of the total exhaust, which is then processed to remove heavy metals and carcinogens. The end-product from this device is a purified carbon-based pigment. Kaalink has been tested on cars, trucks, motorcycles and fishing boats in Bangalore and Hong Kong. The company now has started to work on capturing pollution from static sources of emission such as diesel generators. Third party polluters also send in their PM2.5 pollution to Graviky's recycling warehouses.

Some critics have proposed this device will act similar to a diesel particulate filter, which has been shown to increase back pressure on the engine, thereby marginally affecting the efficiency of the engine, resulting in a loss of power, decreased mileage, and increased CO_{2} emissions.
