= Spheroidal carbonaceous particles =

Type of pollution used in anthropology

Spheroidal carbonaceous particles (SCPs) is a form of black carbon produced from burning fossil fuels in energy production and heavy industry that is thought to provide stratigraphic markers of the human activities that have changed Earth since the 20th century and thus the anthropocene with the unprecedented rise in the industrial carbon intensity. Humans have modified the carbon cycle, leaving footprints of carbon in the air and the outer earth crust. SCPs – just as other pollution markers of modern human industrial activity like plutonium or microplastics, are found in terrestrial and marine sediments or ice cores in every continent and they have turned up there isochronously since the 1950s.

== See also ==
- Carbonaceous
- Soot
