= 2008 California Statewide Truck and Bus Rule =

California Air Resources Board
Agency overview
- Formed: 1967
- Preceding agencies: Bureau of Air Sanitation; Motor Vehicle Pollution Control Board
- Headquarters: 1001 I Street Sacramento, California
- Annual budget: $759 million
- Agency executive: Mary D. Nichols, Chairman
- Parent agency: California Environmental Protection Agency
- Website: http://www.arb.ca.gov

The California Statewide Truck and Bus Rule was initially adopted in December 2008 by the California Air Resources Board (CARB) and requires all heavy-duty diesel trucks and buses that operate in California to retrofit or replace engines in order to reduce diesel emissions. All privately and federally owned diesel-fueled trucks and buses, and privately and publicly owned school buses with a gross vehicle weight rating (GVWR) greater than 14,000 pounds, are covered by the regulation.

Implementation was originally scheduled for January 1, 2011 but recent amendments were considered in December 2010. The rule now requires the installation of particulate matter filters beginning January 1, 2012 and replacement of older engines beginning January 1, 2015. Nearly all applicable vehicles are required to have 2010 model year or the equivalent to 2010 engines by January 1, 2023.

== Background ==
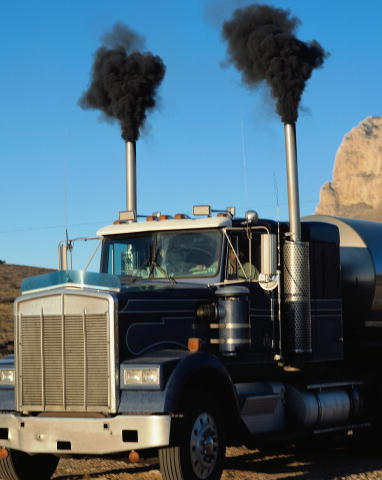
Diesel trucks are the largest emitter of toxic diesel particulate matter in California.

Diesel exhaust particulate matter (PM) was identified as a toxic air contaminant by the Air Resources Board in 1998 after study results showed its potential to cause cancer, premature death, and other health problems. Two years later, in September 2000, the Air Resources Board adopted the Risk Reduction Plan to Reduce Particulate Matter Emissions from Diesel-Fueled Engines and Vehicles which committed to establish retrofit requirements for in-use diesel vehicles to reduce diesel particulate matter 75 percent by 2010 and 85 percent by 2020. In 2007 the Air Resources Board then adopted a State Implementation Plan (SIP) which requires heavy-duty in-use diesel trucks operating in the South Coast and San Joaquin Valley to be retrofitted to meet model year 2007 emission levels by 2014 and 2017, respectively. The State Implementation Plan was implemented to help California's Air Quality Control Regions (AQCR) meet the requirements of the Federal Clean Air Act and also aims to reduce nitrogen oxide emissions (NOx) and ozone in the state. This regulation is the next step to help the Air Resources Board achieve their goal to reduce diesel particulate matter.

With the new amendments in place, diesel emissions are estimated to be 68 percent lower than they would be without the regulation, and emissions of the smog-forming pollutant, nitrogen oxide, will be 25 percent lower. The regulation also aims to save lives and dollars spent on health care. The Air Resources Board estimates that the reduction in diesel emissions is expected to save 9,400 lives within the 11 year time frame and reduce health care costs, with an estimated savings between US$48 billion and $69 billion. By the time the rule is fully implemented in 2023, no truck or bus more than 13 years old will be allowed to operate in California without particulate matter and nitrogen oxide emissions controls.

=== Support ===
The Truck and Bus Rule is considered by the Air Resources Board and other organizations such as the Union of Concerned Scientists and the Environmental Defense Fund as a win-win for the State of California: reducing global greenhouse gas emissions, reducing fuel use, providing fuel and operating cost-savings for truck owners, and reducing smog-forming pollution, in addition to providing human health benefits. According to the Union of Concerned Scientists, the retrofits could reduce global warming pollution by 17 million metric tons of carbon dioxide equivalent (CO_{2}e) by 2020 and a net savings of $30,000 over the life of one long-range truck. In addition to reducing air pollution, this regulation is thought to have helped broaden and strengthen the environmental movement in California.

=== Opposition ===
On February 15, 2011, the California Dump Truck Owners Association (CDTOA) which changed its name to the California Construction Trucking Association (CCTA) in January 2012, filed suit against CARB, stating the Truck and Bus Rule is "unconstitutional as it is preempted by the Federal Aviation Authorization Act (FAAAA) and seeks an injunction prohibiting CARB from enforcing the rule". The FAAAA, enacted in 1994 by the U.S. Congress, "prohibits any state or any political subdivision from enacting or enforcing any regulation related to the price, route, or service of a motor carrier".

The California Dump Truck Owners Association also expresses concerns about the regulation because of the costs to retrofit or replace engines and the economic impact it will have on small business owners whose livelihood relies on the income generated by their trucks. Many of the association's members work closely with the construction industry; therefore, business is already slow during this economic depression. The association has alerted the Air Resources Board that many small businesses will close down if they cannot afford to comply with the regulation.

The science which supports the U.S. Environmental Protection Agency (EPA) and the Air Resources Board's conclusions about the health impacts of diesel particulate matter are also disputed. The conclusions being made to protect human health are considered "exaggerated" and not supported by other research in the field, there are also claims that the Environmental Protection Agency and the Air Resources Board did not correctly calculate all the necessary cancer risks in order to properly regulate diesel emissions.

Other Key Legal Actions & Dates: On October 30, 2013, CCTA received an order from the Ninth Circuit Court of Appeal denying its motion for reconsideration of the ‘en banc’ (full court) petition to review the EPA's determination and approval of the California State Implementation Plan or SIP. This was a longshot based on the timing issues, as the SIP was ‘stealthily’ filed and approved during the litigation against CARB. Related to this is a petition directly to EPA for reconsideration of the approval of the SIP by EPA – again all ‘surreptitiously’ done during direct litigation. This challenge is more an exercise of thoroughness than legal utility. The CCTA's main legal action or FAAAA argument claim, stating that state law (CARB regulations) violates federal law is also on Appeal to the Ninth Circuit Court. The appeal of Judge England's order saying that "he no longer had authority over the case" is still pending and will be appealed ultimately to the U.S. Supreme Court. 1/16/12 – CCTA files a Notice to Appeal with the 9th Circuit Court. View Appeal

2012 12/19/12 – Judges England renders decision. Does not address any elements of our complaint but instead states that “it cannot retain jurisdiction over this action in light of EPA’s approval of the Truck and Bus Regulation as part of California’s SIP”. EPA is now considered an indispensable party to our litigation. View Decision (130.3 kB 2013-01-17 15:57:28). 9/6/12 – Final hearing on our request for relief under the Supremacy Clause (decision pending shortly). 7/19/12 – Court orders second round of supplemental briefing, at issue is whether EPA's SIP adoption makes it an indispensable party 5/31/12 – Court orders supplemental briefs regarding EPA adoption of the SIP (Supplemental briefing completed by 7/12/12) 5/21/12 – Court orders on its own motion the case is stayed indefinitely (MSJ still pending) 2/8/12 – Eve of hearing on MSJ, matter ordered submitted without oral argument 1/30/12 – Order denying preliminary injunction 1/18/12 – Hearing on Summary Judgment continued to 2/9/12

2011 12/15/11 – Hearing on preliminary injunction 11/15/11 – CDTOA Motion for preliminary injunction (a secondary lawsuit) 7/5/11 – CDTOA Motion for Summary Judgment (MSJ); Hearing originally set for 9/6/11, but continued to 1/26/12 to permit discovery

== Regulation ==
Section 2025 of the rule states that "The purpose of this regulation is to reduce emissions of diesel particulate matter (PM), oxides of nitrogen (NOx) and other criteria pollutants, and greenhouse gases from in-use diesel-fueled vehicles". All fleet owners, with the exception of small fleets, have three options to comply with the regulation:

1. They can choose to implement the Best Available Control Technology (BACT). To meet control requirements for both particulate matter and nitrogen oxide, owners can choose to retrofit or replace existing diesel vehicles based on a compliance schedule for engine model years every year starting in 2011.
2. A percent of the total fleet must meet particulate matter Best Available Control Technology and nitrogen oxide Best Available Control Technology by January 1 of each compliance year, by retrofitting or replacing existing diesel vehicles.
3. The fleet must meet an average requirement set by the Air Resources Board for particulate matter, nitrogen oxide, or both pollutants, depending on the Nitrogen Oxide Index and Particulate Matter Index established by CARB.

These regulations apply to any business, person, federal government agency or school district that owns, operates, sells or runs vehicles operated on diesel-fuel.

The requirements of the regulation are as follows under section 2025:

- Fleet owners must abide by best available control technology (BACT) or by BACT percentage limits. (p. 15)
- Fleets can meet requirements by achieving Particulate Matter or Nitrogen oxide reductions by replacing an engine or entire vehicle.
- Records must be kept to prove compliance and maintenance of the vehicle.
- Once vehicles are in compliance they must stay in compliance when operating in California.

Vehicles that are exempt from the regulation include:

- Used for Solid Waste Collection
- Heavy-duty over 14,000 pounds that comply with BACT and are owned/operated by a municipality
- Subject to fleet rule for transit agencies
- 19,500 pounds or less exclusively used for personal non-commercial/governmental use
- Subject to drayage truck regulations
- Private use motor homes
- Historic (as defined by the Air Resources Board under Section 2025)
- Two-engine cranes
- Exclusively used for snow-removal
- Off-road vehicles subject to Title 13 of the California Code of Regulations for Motor Vehicles
- Authorized for emergency use
- Military tactical support vehicles under Title 13 of the California Code of Regulations for Motor Vehicles
- Subject to the rule for intermodal rail yards, and mobile cargo handling equipment at ports under Title 13 of the California Code of Regulations for Motor Vehicles

== Fleet compliance assistance tools ==
In order to assist truck owners to meet the standards of the regulation, the Air Resources Board provides compliance tools on their website. An Excel spreadsheet called the “Fleet Calculator” assists owners to comply with the truck and bus rule. The owners can determine what type of compliance options may be available by inputting engine model year and emission control technology assumptions into the calculator. The tool follows regulation amendments, and a hotline has been set up for fleet owners called the Air Resources Board's Diesel Hotline.

== Reporting ==
The system utilized for reporting is the Truck Regulations Upload and Compliance Reporting System (TRUCRS). Reporting guidelines are not required until 2012, however fleets can take advantage of Agricultural Vehicle Provisions or to meet requirements for Tier 0 auxiliary engines in street sweepers. By April 29, 2011, these previously mentioned two-engine street sweepers have to start reporting hourly meter readings beginning January 1, 2011. In order to meet these guidelines, reports can be made online or in paper format. Also by April 29, 2011, those fleets that reported Agricultural Provisions in the previous year can update their January 1, 2011 odometer readings in order to qualify for Agricultural Vehicle Provisions. Annual reporting will be mandatory as of January 31, 2012.

All fleet owners may submit reporting materials using paper or electronic forms reporting annually until the expiration of requirements or until the year after Best Available Control Technology. Owner contact and vehicle information including but not limited to type, gross vehicle weight rating and model year are mandatory as a part of reporting. Engine information, verified diesel emission control strategies (VDECS), and highest available VDECS must also be submitted into reporting. Low-use vehicles, fleets claiming vehicle retirement credits, school bus fleets/sub-fleets, agricultural fleets, vehicles exempt from NOx BACT and emergency support vehicles have their own specified reporting conditions which coincide and build onto the overall reporting requirements.

All reports must submit compliance certification signed by a responsible official or a designee to confirm that the reporting is accurate prior to submission to the executive officer. If there are any changes since the last reporting, the responsible party must report it to the executive officer. These changes include vehicles that may be removed or added to the fleet or those vehicles that have recently been repowered or retrofitted. New fleet reporting for those that elect to use the Best Available Control Technology percent limits must also submit information to the executive officer. By January 31 of each year, owners must submit information regarding claiming compliance extensions for manufacturer delays including the date of purchase of verified diesel emission control strategies, date the vehicle was placed into service, the date of removal from service, and identification of vehicle that was replaced.

== Exhaust retrofits ==
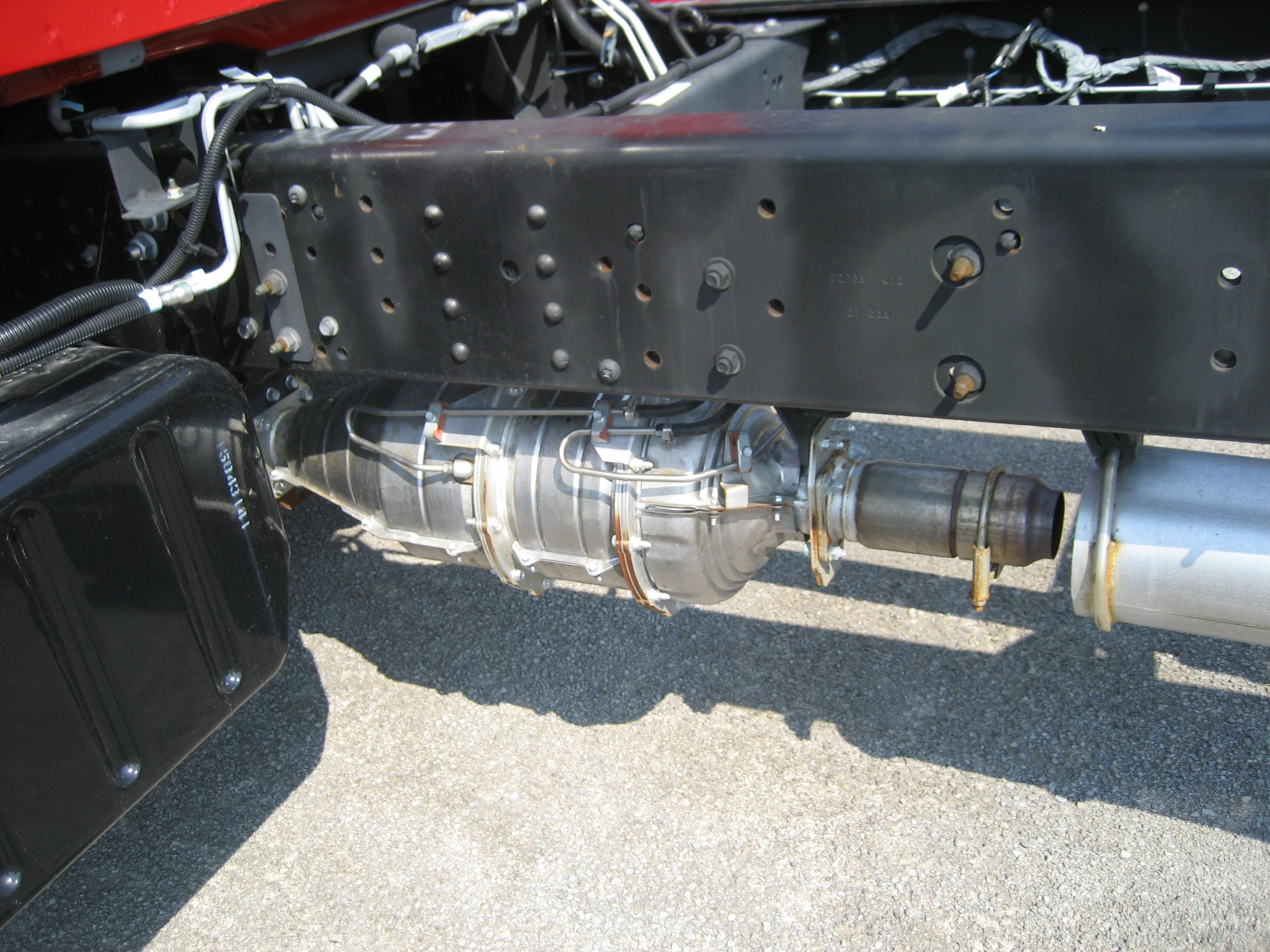
A diesel particulate filter on a 2008 GM Isuzu

Operators of diesel vehicles and equipment must install Diesel Emission Control Strategies (DECS) to new and existing engines in order to comply with the regulation. DECS are technology-based retrofits that reduce pollutants from diesel exhaust before they are released into the air. A commonly used DECS technology is the diesel particulate filter which serves as a substitution for an engine's original factory muffler. All Diesel Emission Control Strategies must be verified and approved by the Air Resources Board to ensure proper particulate matter and nitrogen oxide reductions will be met.

== Health impacts ==
Diesel truck emissions include smog-forming nitrogen oxide and are the largest source of diesel particulate matter which is known to cause harm to the lungs, the immune system, the heart and cardiovascular system, and the developing brain. Seventy percent of California's risk for cancer from airborne toxics in 2000 was attributed to diesel particulate matter. In 2004 it was estimated that premature death rates from diesel pollution would supersede the death rates from homicides that year. It is projected that reducing emissions today would prevent 11,000 premature deaths and 16,000 hospital admissions by 2020. The cost-benefit analysis of reducing diesel pollution concluded with the results that small costs of pollution cleanup can drastically cut health-related costs, such as reduced hospitalization.

The areas of California with the highest health related risks in exposure to diesel pollution are those that are the most densely populated air basins. Half of California's diesel pollution illnesses occur in the South Coast. 45% of the State's population resides here, and they breathe 30% of particulate matter and nitrogen oxide (NOx). The South Coast's projected cost of health impacts is totaled at $10.2 billion per year. The San Francisco Bay Area is the second most highly affected region in California taking in 17% of the state's diesel pollution. The estimated health related costs for the Bay Area are $3.7 billion per year.

== See also ==
- Emission standard
