= Soot =

Product of incomplete combustion of hydrocarbons

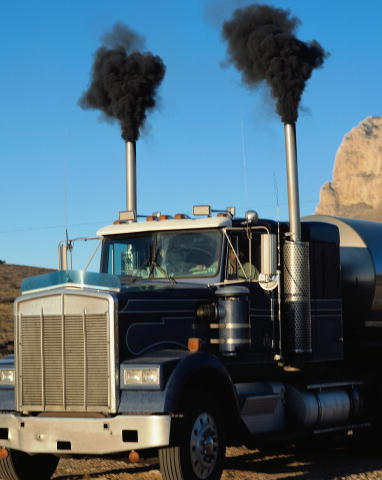
Emission of soot in the exhaust gas of a large diesel truck, without particle filters

Soot (/sʊt/ suut) is a mass of impure carbon particles resulting from the incomplete combustion of hydrocarbons. Soot is considered a hazardous substance with carcinogenic properties. Most broadly, the term includes all the particulate matter produced by this process, including black carbon and residual pyrolysed fuel particles such as coal, cenospheres, charred wood, and petroleum coke classified as cokes or char. It can include polycyclic aromatic hydrocarbons and heavy metals like mercury.

Soot causes various types of cancer and lung disease.

== Terminology ==
=== Definition ===
Among scientists, exact definitions for soot vary, depending partly on their field. For example, atmospheric scientists may use a different definition compared to toxicologists. Soot's definition can also vary across time, and from paper to paper even among scientists in the same field. A common feature of the definitions is that soot is composed largely of carbon-based particles resulting from the incomplete burning of hydrocarbons or organic fuel such as wood. Some note that soot may be formed by other high-temperature processes, not just by burning. Soot typically takes an aerosol form when first created. It tends to eventually settle onto surfaces, though some parts of it may be decomposed while still airborne. In some definitions, soot is defined purely as carbonaceous particles, but in others it is defined to include the whole ensemble of particles resulting from partial combustion of organic matter or fossil fuels—as such it can include non-carbon elements like sulfur and even traces of metal. In many definitions, soot is assumed to be black, but in some definitions it can be composed partly or even mainly of brown carbon, and so can also be medium or even light grey in colour.

=== Related terms ===
Terms like "soot", "carbon black", and "black carbon" are often used to mean the same thing, even in the scientific literature, but other scientists have stated this is incorrect and that they refer to chemically and physically distinct things.

Carbon black is a term for powdery carbonaceous matter whose industrial production has been underway since the 19th century. Carbon black is composed almost entirely of elemental carbon. Carbon black is not found in regular soot—only in the special soot that is intentionally produced for its manufacture, mostly from specialised oil furnaces.

Black carbon is a term that arose in the late twentieth century among atmospheric scientists, to describe strongly light-absorbing carbonaceous particles which have a significant climate forcing effect—second only to CO_{2} itself as a contributor to short-term global warming. The term is sometimes used synonymously with soot, but is now used preferentially in atmospheric science, though some prefer more precise terms like light-absorbing carbon. Unlike carbon black, black carbon is produced unintentionally. The chemical composition of black carbon is much more varied, and typically has a much lower proportion of elemental carbon, compared with carbon black. In some definitions, black carbon also includes charcoal, a type of matter where the chunks tend to be too large to have an aerosol form as is the case with soot.

== Sources ==
Soot as an airborne contaminant in the environment has many different sources, all of which are results of some form of pyrolysis. They include soot from coal burning, internal-combustion engines, power-plant boilers, hog-fuel boilers, ship boilers, central steam-heat boilers, waste incineration, local field burning, house fires, forest fires, fireplaces, and furnaces. These exterior sources also contribute to the indoor-environment sources such as smoking of plant matter, cooking, oil lamps, candles, quartz/halogen bulbs with settled dust, fireplaces, exhaust emissions from vehicles, and defective furnaces. Soot in very low concentrations is capable of darkening surfaces or making particle agglomerates, such as those from ventilation systems, appear black. Soot is the primary cause of "ghosting", the discoloration of walls and ceilings or walls and flooring where they meet. It is generally responsible for the discoloration of the walls above baseboard electric heating units.

The formation and properties of soot depend strongly on the fuel composition, but may also be influenced by flame temperature. Regarding fuel composition, the rank ordering of sooting tendency of fuel components is: naphthalenes → benzenes → aliphatics. However, the order of sooting tendencies of the aliphatics (alkanes, alkenes, and alkynes) varies dramatically depending on the flame type. The difference between the sooting tendencies of aliphatics and aromatics is thought to result mainly from the different routes of formation. Aliphatics appear to first form acetylene and polyacetylenes, which is a slow process; aromatics can form soot both by this route and also by a more direct pathway involving ring condensation or polymerization reactions building on the existing aromatic structure.

== Description ==
The Intergovernmental Panel on Climate Change (IPCC) adopted the description of soot particles given in the glossary of Charlson and Heintzenberg (1995), "Particles formed during the quenching of gases at the outer edge of flames of organic vapours, consisting predominantly of carbon, with lesser amounts of oxygen and hydrogen present as carboxyl and phenolic groups and exhibiting an imperfect graphitic structure".

Formation of soot is a complex process, an evolution of matter in which a number of molecules undergo many chemical and physical reactions within a few milliseconds. Soot always contains nanoparticles of graphite and diamond, a phenomenon known as gemmy soot. Soot is a powder-like form of amorphous carbon. Gas-phase soot contains polycyclic aromatic hydrocarbons (PAHs). The PAHs in soot are known mutagens and are classified as a "known human carcinogen" by the International Agency for Research on Cancer (IARC). Soot forms during incomplete combustion from precursor molecules such as acetylene. It consists of agglomerated nanoparticles with diameters between 6 and 30 nm. The soot particles can be mixed with metal oxides and with minerals and can be coated with sulfuric acid.

== Soot formation mechanism ==
Many details of soot formation chemistry remain unanswered and controversial, but there have been a few agreements:

- Soot begins with some precursors or building blocks.
- Nucleation of heavy molecules occurs to form particles.
- Surface growth of a particle proceeds by adsorption of gas-phase molecules.
- Coagulation happens via reactive particle–particle collisions.
- Oxidation of the molecules and soot particles reduces soot formation.

== Hazards ==
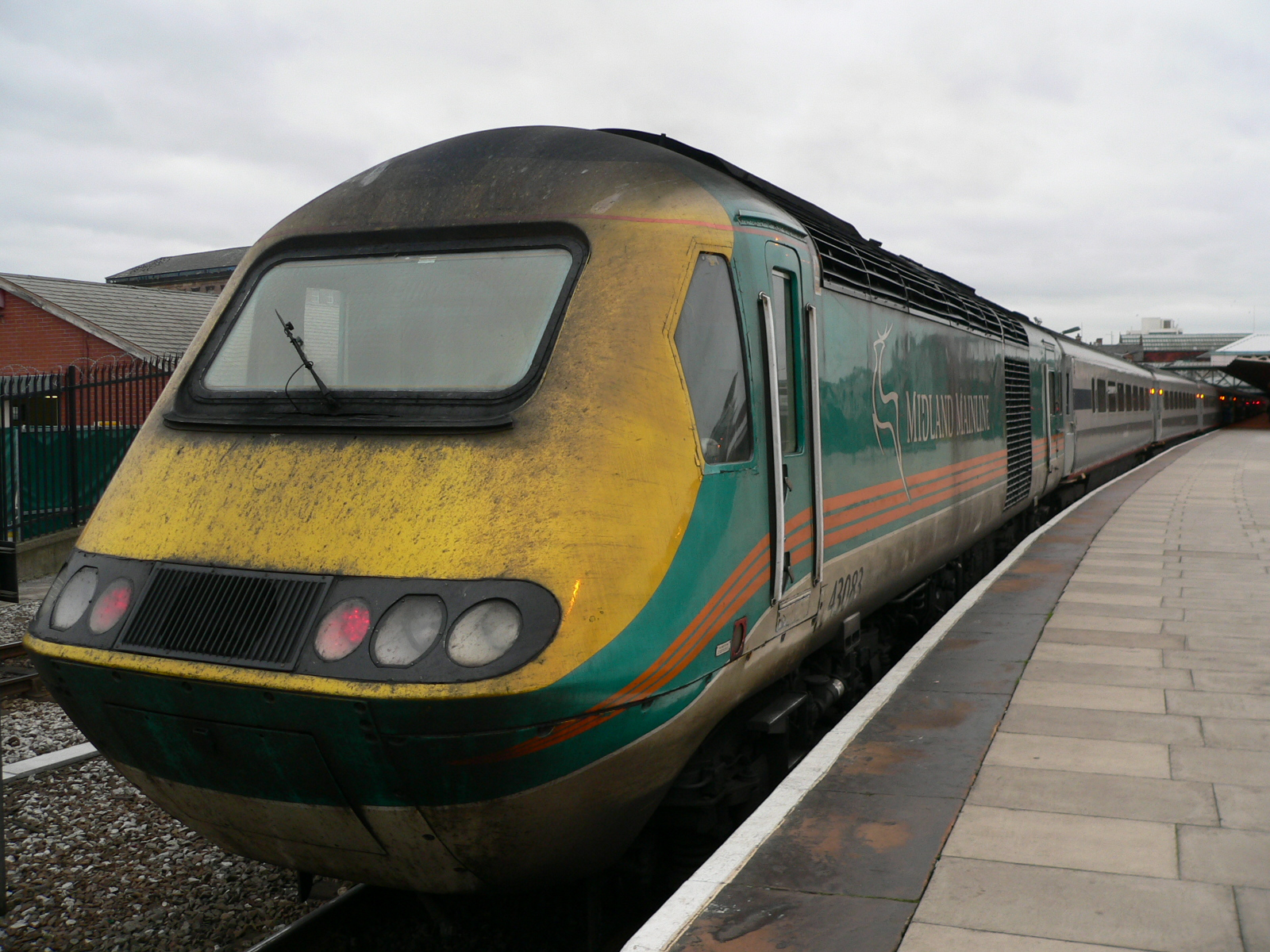
The black staining on the power car of this Midland Mainline InterCity 125 High Speed Train is the result of soot building up on the train's surface.

Soot, particularly diesel exhaust pollution, accounts for over one-quarter of the total hazardous pollution in the air.

Among these diesel emission components, particulate matter has been a serious concern for human health due to its direct and broad impact on the respiratory organs. In earlier times, health professionals associated PM_{10} (diameter < 10 μm) with chronic lung disease, lung cancer, influenza, asthma, and increased mortality rate. However, recent scientific studies suggest that these correlations be more closely linked with fine particles (PM_{2.5}) and ultra-fine particles (PM_{0.1}).

Long-term exposure to urban air pollution containing soot increases the risk of coronary artery disease.

Diesel exhaust (DE) gas is a major contributor to combustion-derived particulate-matter air pollution. In human experimental studies using an exposure chamber setup, DE has been linked to acute vascular dysfunction and increased thrombus formation. This serves as a plausible mechanistic link between the previously described association between particulate-matter air pollution and increased cardiovascular morbidity and mortality.

Soot also tends to form in chimneys in domestic houses possessing one or more fireplaces. If a large deposit collects in one, it can ignite and create a chimney fire. Regular cleaning by a chimney sweep should eliminate the problem.

== Soot modeling ==
Soot mechanisms are difficult to model mathematically because of the large number of primary components of diesel fuel, complex combustion mechanisms, and the heterogeneous interactions during soot formation. Soot models are broadly categorized into three subgroups: empirical (equations that are adjusted to match experimental soot profiles), semi-empirical (combinations of mathematical equations and empirical models used for particle-number density, soot volume, and mass fraction), and detailed theoretical mechanisms (covers detailed chemical kinetics and physical models in all phases).

First, empirical models use correlations of experimental data to predict trends in soot production. Empirical models are easy to implement and provide excellent correlations for a given set of operating conditions. However, empirical models cannot be used to investigate the underlying mechanisms of soot production. Therefore, these models are not flexible enough to handle changes in operating conditions. They are only useful for testing previously established designed experiments under specific conditions.

Second, semi-empirical models solve rate equations that are calibrated using experimental data. Semi-empirical models reduce computational costs primarily by simplifying the chemistry in soot formation and oxidation. Semi-empirical models reduce the size of chemical mechanisms and use simpler molecules, such as acetylene, as precursors. Detailed theoretical models use extensive chemical mechanisms containing hundreds of chemical reactions in order to predict concentrations of soot. Detailed theoretical soot models contain all the components present in soot formation with a high level of detailed chemical and physical processes.

Finally, comprehensive models (detailed models) are usually expensive and slow to compute, as they are much more complex than empirical or semi-empirical models. Thanks to recent technological progress in computation, it has become more feasible to use detailed theoretical models and obtain more realistic results; however, further advancement of comprehensive theoretical models is limited by the accuracy of modeling of formation mechanisms.

Additionally, phenomenological models have found wide use recently. Phenomenological soot models, which may be categorized as semi-empirical models, correlate empirically observed phenomena in a way that is consistent with the fundamental theory, but is not directly derived from the theory. These models use sub-models developed to describe the different processes (or phenomena) observed during the combustion process. Examples of sub-models of phenomenological empirical models include spray model, lift-off model, heat release model, ignition delay model, etc. These sub-models can be empirically developed from observation or by using basic physical and chemical relations. Phenomenological models are accurate for their relative simplicity. They are useful, especially when the accuracy of the model parameters is low. Unlike empirical models, phenomenological models are flexible enough to produce reasonable results when multiple operating conditions change.

== Applications ==
Historically, soot was used in manufacturing artistic paints and shoe polish, as well as a blackener for Russia leather for boots. With the advent of the printing press, it was used in the printing ink well into the 20th century.

== See also ==
- Activated carbon
- Atmospheric particulate matter
- Bistre
- Black carbon
- Carbon black
- Coal
- Colorant
- Creosote
- Diesel particulate matter
- Dust
- Fullerene
- Health effects of coal ash
- Health effects of wood smoke
- Indian ink
- Joss paper
- Open burning of waste
- Rolling coal
- Soot blower
- Spheroidal carbonaceous particles
- Sulfur dioxide
