= Wet stacking =

Condition in diesel engines

Wet stacking is a condition in diesel engines in which unburned fuel passes on into the exhaust system. The word "stacking" comes from the term "stack" for exhaust pipe or chimney stack. The oily exhaust pipe is therefore a "wet stack."

This condition can have several causes. The most common cause is idling the engine for long intervals, which does not generate enough heat in the cylinder for a complete burn. "Idling" may be running at full rated operating speed, but with very little load applied. Another is excessive fueling. That may be caused by weak or leaky injectors, fuel settings turned up too high or over fueling for the given rpms. Cold weather running or other causes that prevent the engine from reaching proper operating temperature can cause a buildup of fuel due to incomplete burn that can result in wet stacking. In diesel generators, it is usually because the diesel engine is running at only a small percentage of its rated output. For efficient combustion, a diesel engine should not be run under at least 60 percent of its rated power output.

Wet stacking is detectable by the presence of a black ooze around the exhaust manifold, piping and turbocharger, if fitted. It can be mistaken for lubricating oil in some cases, but it consists of the "heavy ends" of the diesel fuel which do not burn when combustion temperature is too low. The heavier, more oily components of diesel fuel contain more stored energy than a comparable quantity of gasoline, but diesel requires an adequate loading of the engine in order to keep combustion temperature high enough to make use of it. Often, one can hear a slight miss in the engine due to fuel buildup. When the engine is first placed under a load after long periods of idling and wet stacking, it may blow some black exhaust out as it burns that excess fuel off. Continuous black exhaust from the stack when under a constant load is also an indication that some of the fuel is not being burned. Additionally, wet stacking can result in a build up of diesel fuel in the engine which does not combust due to the low temperature in the engine. This results in a reduced fuel economy. This fuel leaks through the cylinders and dilutes the engine oil. If not frequently changed, this diluted oil can lead to increased wear on the cylinder and premature engine failure.

== See also ==
- Crankcase dilution
- Rolling coal, modifying an engine for intentional wet stacking
