= Carbonaceous =

Relating to the element carbon

Carbonaceous refers to something relating to, containing, or composed of carbon. It is a descriptor used for the attribute of any substance rich in carbon. Particularly, carbonaceous hydrocarbons are very unsaturated, high-molecular-weight hydrocarbons, having an elevated carbon:hydrogen ratio. The carbonaceous chondrites are meteorites that are rich in carbon.

The word "carbonaceous" was first used in 1791.

In geology, metamorphism of a carbonaceous geological material is expressed as a graphitisation process, referring to the graphite generated. Graphitisation may be accelerated or retarded in dependence on various metamorphic or lithological factors involved.

== See also ==
- Carbonaceous chondrite
- Carbonaceous film
- Carbonaceous soil
- C-type (carbonaceous) asteroid
- Spheroidal carbonaceous particles (SCPs)
