= Diesel particulate filter =

Removes diesel particulate matter or soot from the exhaust gas of a diesel engine

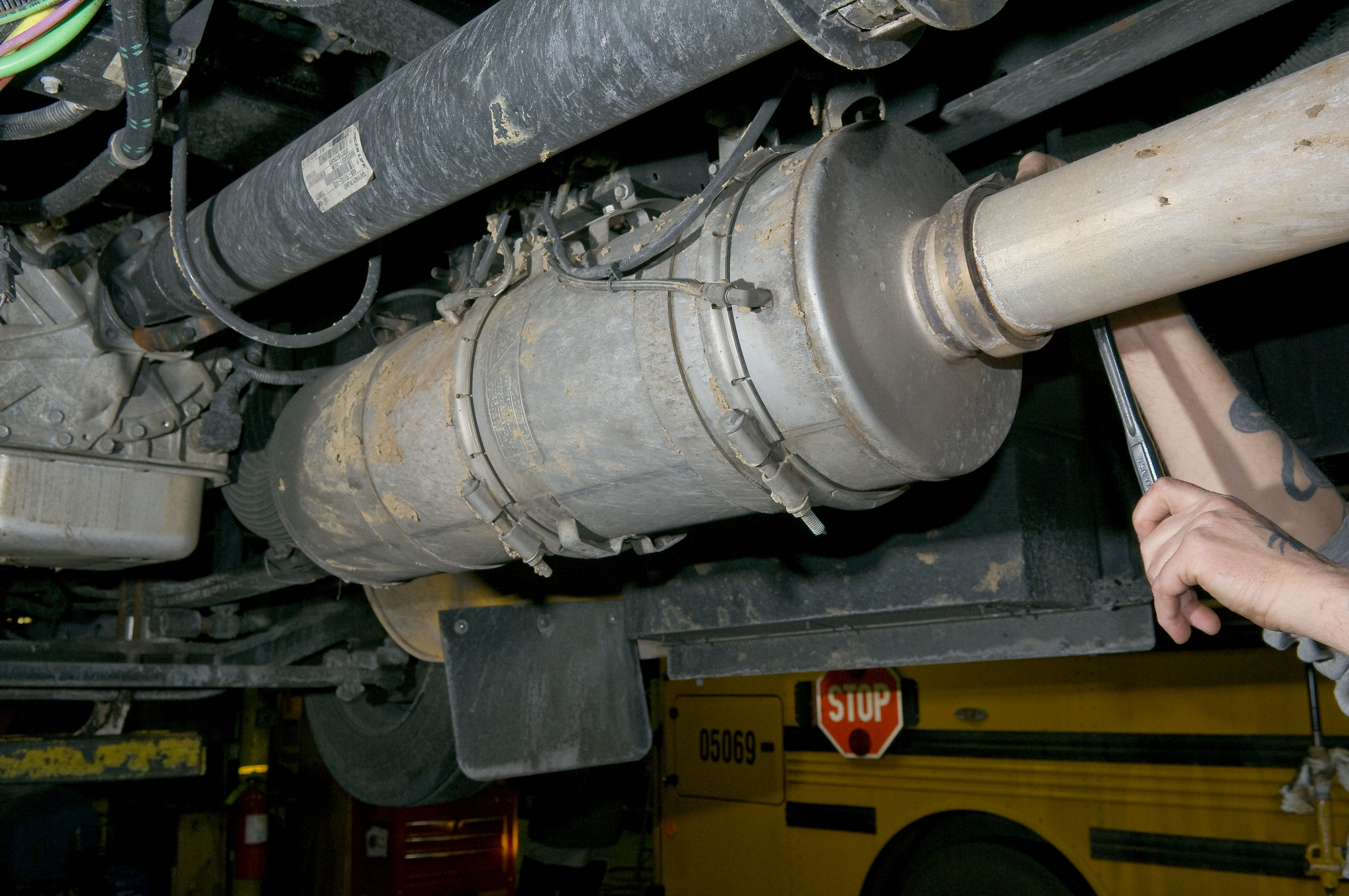
Diesel particulate filter of a school bus

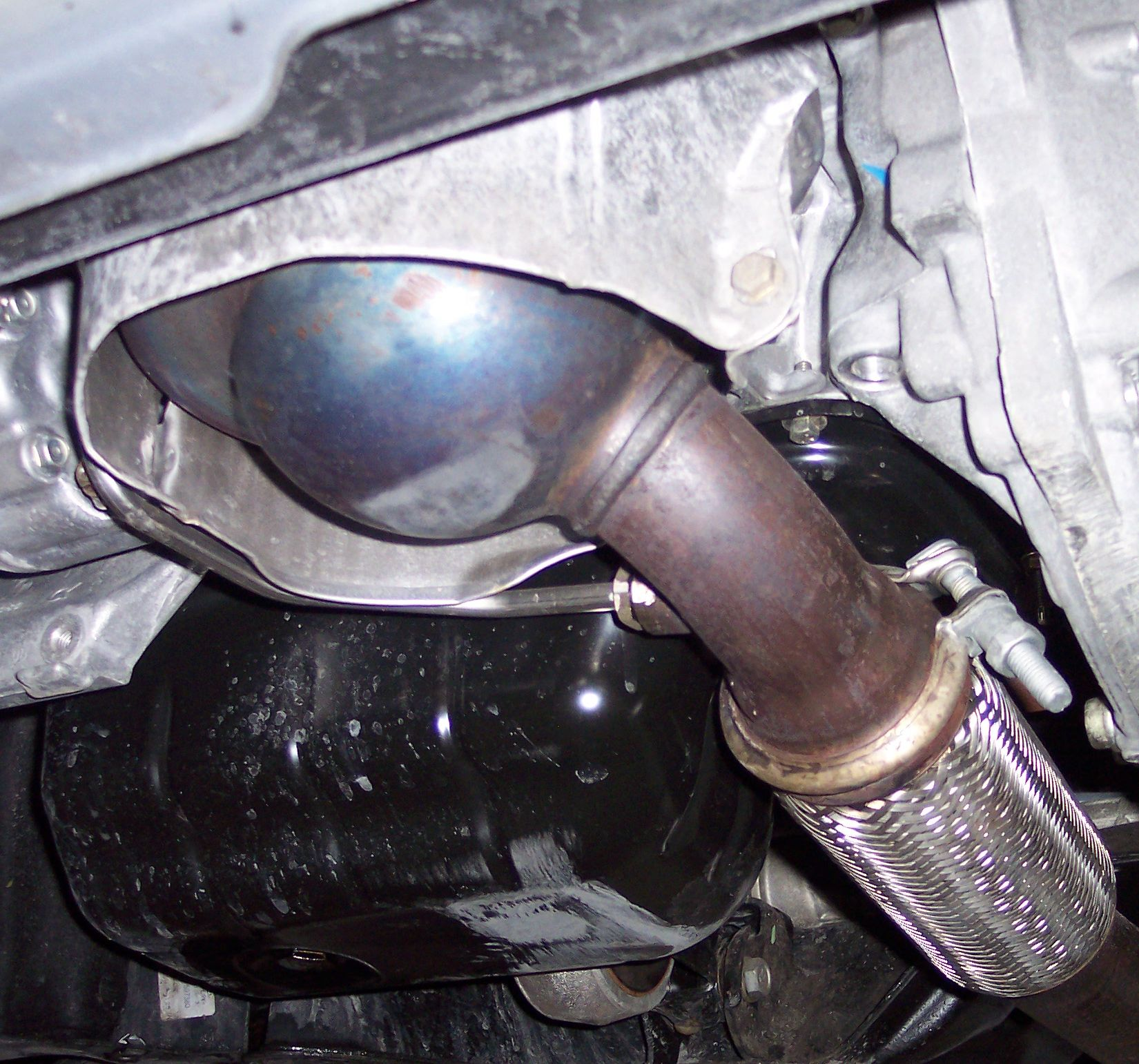
A diesel particulate filter (top left) in a Peugeot

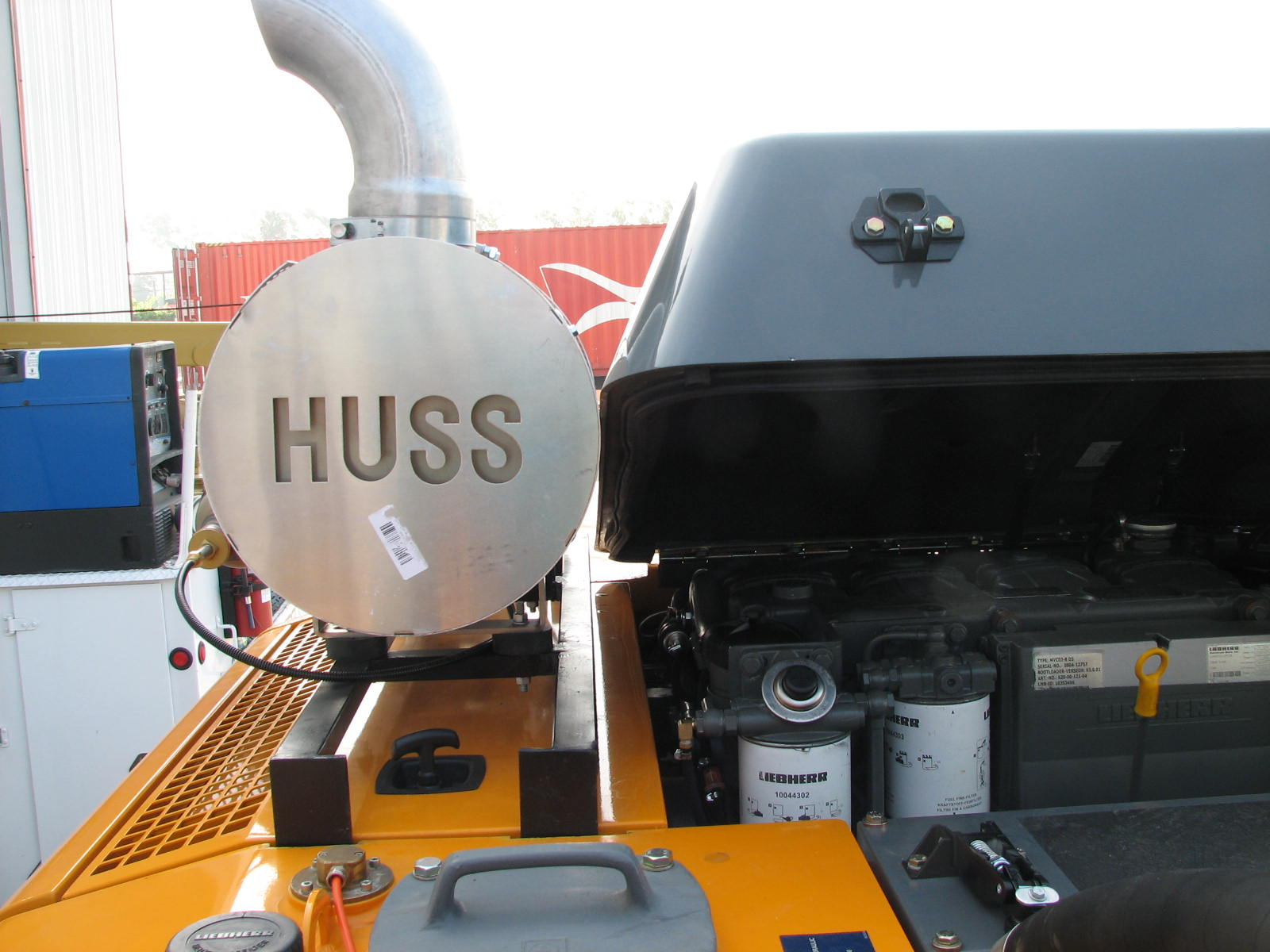
Off-road – DPF installation

A diesel particulate filter (DPF) is a device designed to remove diesel particulate matter or soot from the exhaust gas of a diesel engine.

== Mode of action ==
Wall-flow diesel particulate filters usually remove 85% or more of the soot, and under certain conditions can attain soot removal efficiencies approaching 100%. Some filters are single-use, intended for disposal and replacement once full of accumulated ash. Others are designed to burn off the accumulated particulate either passively through the use of a catalyst or by active means such as a fuel burner which heats the filter to soot combustion temperatures. This is accomplished by engine programming to run (when the filter is full) in a manner that elevates exhaust temperature, in conjunction with an extra fuel injector in the exhaust stream that injects fuel to react with a catalyst element to burn off accumulated soot in the DPF filter, or through other methods. This is known as filter regeneration. Cleaning is also required as part of periodic maintenance, and it must be done carefully to avoid damaging the filter. Failure of fuel injectors or turbochargers resulting in contamination of the filter with raw diesel or engine oil can also necessitate cleaning. The regeneration process occurs at road speeds higher than can generally be attained on city streets; vehicles driven exclusively at low speeds in urban traffic can require periodic trips at higher speeds to clean out the DPF. If the driver ignores the warning light and waits too long to operate the vehicle above 60 km/h (40 mph), the DPF may not regenerate properly, and continued operation past that point may spoil the DPF completely so it must be replaced. Some newer diesel engines, namely those installed in combination vehicles, can also perform what is called a Parked Regeneration, where the engine increases RPM to around 1400 while parked, to increase the temperature of the exhaust.

Diesel engines produce a variety of particles during the combustion of the fuel/air mix due to incomplete combustion. The composition of the particles varies widely dependent upon engine type, age, and the emissions specification that the engine was designed to meet. Two-stroke diesel engines produce more particulate per unit of power than do four-stroke diesel engines, as they burn the fuel-air mix less completely.

Diesel particulate matter resulting from the incomplete combustion of diesel fuel produces soot (black carbon) particles. These particles include tiny nanoparticles—smaller than one micrometre (one micron). Soot and other particles from diesel engines worsen the particulate matter pollution in the air and are harmful to health. New particulate filters can capture from 30% to greater than 95% of the harmful soot. With an optimal diesel particulate filter (DPF), soot emissions may be decreased to 0.001 g/km or less.

== History ==
Diesel particulate filtering was first considered in the 1970s due to concerns regarding the impacts of inhaled particulates. Particulate filters have been in use on non-road machines since 1980, and in automobiles since 1985. Historically medium and heavy duty diesel engine emissions were not regulated until 1987 when the first California Heavy Truck rule was introduced capping particulate emissions at 0.60 g/BHP Hour. Since then, progressively tighter standards have been introduced for light- and heavy-duty road-going diesel-powered vehicles and for off-road diesel engines. Similar regulations have also been adopted by the European Union and some individual European countries, most Asian countries, and the rest of North and South America.

Whilst few jurisdictions have explicitly made filters mandatory, the increasingly stringent emissions regulations that engine manufacturers must meet mean that eventually all on-road diesel engines will be fitted with them. In the European Union, filters are highly recommended and effectively necessary to meet the Euro 6 Heavy-Duty emissions standards for vehicles such as lorries. In 2000, in anticipation of the future Euro 5 regulations PSA Peugeot Citroën became the first company to make filters standard on passenger cars. Euro 5 regulations, fully coming into force in January 2011, require that diesel cars must have a diesel particulate filter.

As of December 2008, the California Air Resources Board (CARB) established the 2008 California Statewide Truck and Bus Rule which—with variance according to vehicle type, size and usage—requires that on-road diesel heavy trucks and buses in California be retrofitted, repowered, or replaced to reduce particulate matter (PM) emissions by at least 85%. Retrofitting the engines with CARB-approved diesel particulate filters is one way to fulfil this requirement. In 2009 the American Recovery and Reinvestment Act provided funding to assist owners in offsetting the cost of diesel retrofits for their vehicles. Other jurisdictions have also launched retrofit programs, including:

- 2001 – Hong Kong retrofit program.
- 2002 – In Japan the Prefecture of Tokyo passed a law banning trucks without filters from entering the city limits.
- 2003 – Mexico City started a program to retrofit trucks.
- 2004 – New York City retrofit program (non-road).
- 2008 – Milan Ecopass area traffic charge – a hefty entrance tax on all diesel vehicles except those with a particulate filter, either stock or retrofit.
- 2008 – London low emission zone charges vehicles that do not meet emission standards, encouraging retrofit filters.

Inadequately maintained particulate filters on vehicles with diesel engines are prone to soot buildup, which can cause engine problems due to high back pressure.

In 2018, the UK made changes to its MOT test requirements, including tougher scrutiny of diesel cars. One requirement was to have a properly fitted and working DPF. Driving without a DPF could incur a £1000 fine.

== Variants of DPFs ==
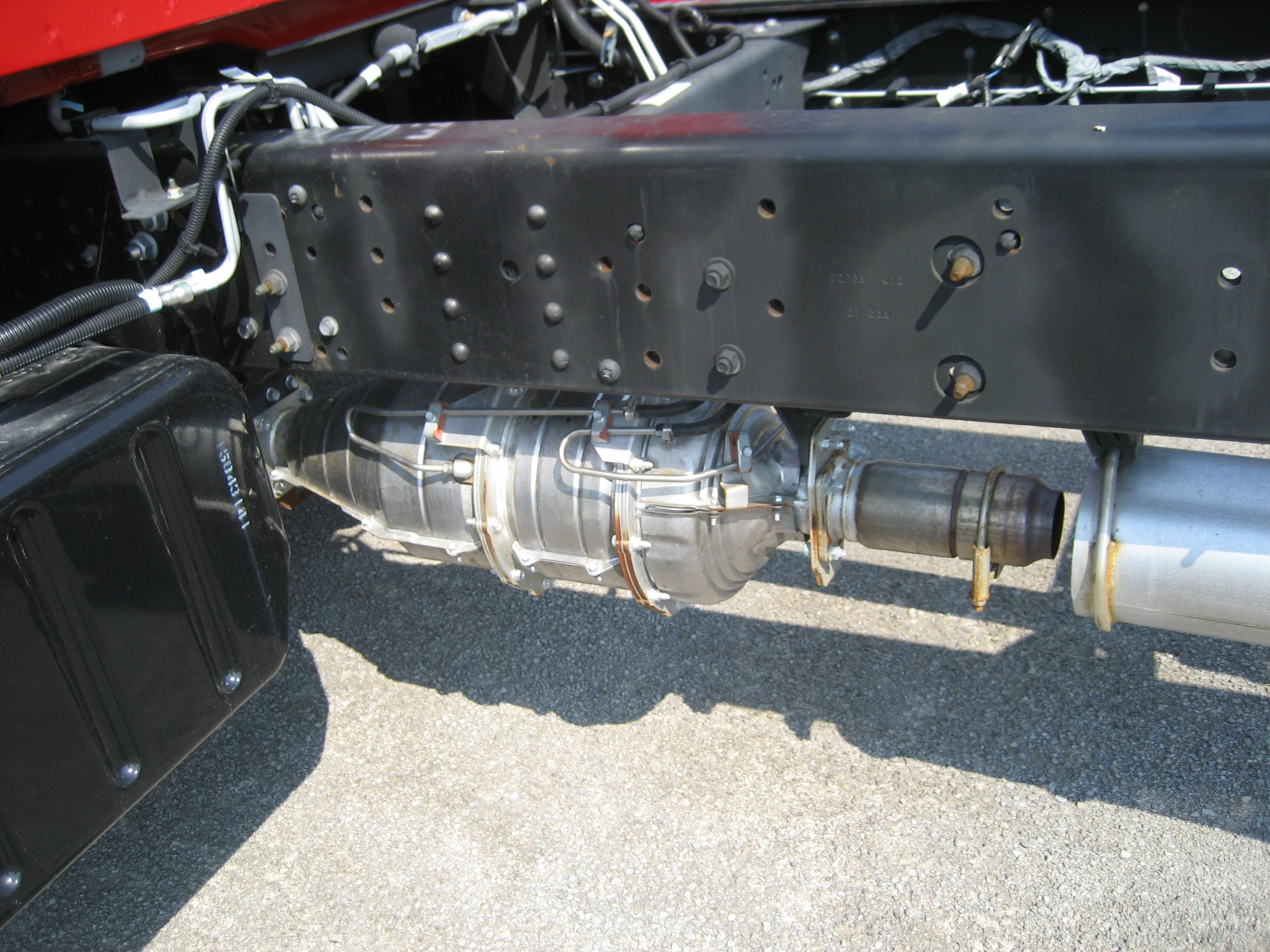
Cordierite Diesel Particulate Filter on GM 7.8 Isuzu

Unlike a catalytic converter which is a flow-through device, a DPF retains bigger exhaust gas particles by forcing the gas to flow through the filter material before exiting; however, the DPF does not retain small particles. Maintenance-free DPFs oxidise or burn larger particles until they are small enough to pass through the filter, though often particles "clump" together in the DPF reducing the overall particle count as well as overall mass. There are a variety of diesel particulate filter technologies on the market. Each is designed around similar requirements:

1. Fine filtration
2. Minimum pressure drop
3. Low cost
4. Mass production suitability
5. Product durability

=== Cordierite wall flow filters ===
The most common filter is made of cordierite (a ceramic material that is also used as catalytic converter supports (cores)). Cordierite filters provide excellent filtration efficiency, are relatively inexpensive, and have thermal properties that make packaging them for installation in the vehicle simple. The major drawback is that cordierite has a relatively low melting point (about 1200 °C) and cordierite substrates have been known to melt during filter regeneration. This is mostly an issue if the filter has become loaded more heavily than usual, and is more of an issue with passive systems than with active systems, unless there is a system breakdown.

Cordierite filter cores look like catalytic converter cores that have had alternate channels plugged – the plugs force the exhaust gas flow through the wall and the particulate collects on the inlet face.

=== Silicon carbide wall flow filters ===
The second most popular filter material is silicon carbide, or SiC. It has a higher (2700 °C) melting point than cordierite, however, it is not as stable thermally, making packaging an issue. Small SiC cores are made of single pieces, while larger cores are made in segments, which are separated by a special cement so that heat expansion of the core will be taken up by the cement, and not the package. SiC cores are usually more expensive than cordierite cores, however they are manufactured in similar sizes, and one can often be used to replace the other. Silicon carbide filter cores also look like catalytic converter cores that have had alternate channels plugged – again the plugs force the exhaust gas flow through the wall and the particulate collects on the inlet face.

The characteristics of the wall flow diesel particulate filter substrate are:

- broad band filtration (the diameters of the filtered particles are 0.2–150 μm)
- high filtration efficiency (can be up to 95%)
- high refractory
- high mechanical properties
- high boiling point.

=== Ceramic fiber filters ===
Fibrous ceramic filters are made from several different types of ceramic fibers that are mixed together to form a porous medium. This medium can be formed into almost any shape and can be customized to suit various applications. The porosity can be controlled in order to produce high flow, lower efficiency or high efficiency lower volume filtration. Fibrous filters have an advantage over wall flow design of producing lower back pressure. Fibrous ceramic filters remove carbon particulates almost completely, including fine particulates less than 100 nanometres (nm) diameter with an efficiency of greater than 95% in mass and greater than 99% in number of particles over a wide range of engine operating conditions. Since the continuous flow of soot into the filter would eventually block it, it is necessary to 'regenerate' the filtration properties of the filter by burning off the collected particulate on a regular basis. Soot particulate burn-off forms water and CO_{2} in small quantities amounting to less than 0.05% of the CO_{2} emitted by the engine.

=== Metal fiber flow-through filters ===
Some cores are made from metal fibers – generally the fibers are "woven" into a monolith. Such cores have the advantage that an electrical current can be passed through the monolith to heat the core for regeneration purposes, allowing the filter to regenerate at low exhaust temperatures and/or low exhaust flow rates. Metal fiber cores tend to be more expensive than cordierite or silicon carbide cores, and are generally not interchangeable with them because of the electrical requirement.

=== Paper ===
Disposable paper cores are used in certain specialty applications, without a regeneration strategy. Coal mines are common users – the exhaust gas is usually first passed through a water trap to cool it, and then through the filter. Paper filters are also used when a diesel machine must be used indoors for short periods of time, such as on a forklift being used to install equipment inside a store.

=== Partial filters ===
There are a variety of devices that produce over 50% particulate matter filtration, but less than 85%. Partial filters come in a variety of materials. The only commonality between them is that they produce more back pressure than a catalytic converter, and less than a diesel particulate filter. Partial filter technology is popular for retrofit.

== Maintenance ==
Filters require more maintenance than catalytic converters. Ash, a byproduct of oil consumption from normal engine operation, builds up in the filter as it cannot be converted into a gas and pass through the walls of the filter. This increases the pressure before the filter.

DPF filters go through a regeneration process which removes this soot and lowers the filter pressure. There are three types of regeneration: passive, active, and forced.

Passive regeneration takes place normally while driving, when engine load and vehicle drive-cycle create temperatures that are high enough to regenerate the soot buildup on the DPF walls.

Active regeneration happens while the vehicle is in use, when low engine load and lower exhaust gas temperatures inhibit the naturally occurring passive regeneration. Sensors upstream and downstream of the DPF (or a differential pressure sensor) provide readings that initiate a metered addition of fuel into the exhaust stream. There are two methods to inject fuel, either downstream injection directly into the exhaust stream, downstream of the turbo, or fuel injection into the engine cylinders on the exhaust stroke. This fuel and exhaust gas mixture passes through the Diesel Oxidation Catalyst (DOC) creating temperatures high enough to burn off the accumulated soot. Once the pressure drop across the DPF lowers to a calculated value, the process ends, until the soot accumulation builds up again. This works well for vehicles that drive longer distances with few stops compared to those that perform short trips with many starts and stops.

If the filter develops too much pressure then the last type of regeneration must be used – a forced regeneration. This can be accomplished in two ways. The vehicle operator can initiate the regeneration via a dashboard mounted switch. Various signal interlocks, such as park brake applied, transmission in neutral, engine coolant temperature, and an absence of engine related fault codes are required (vary by OEM and application) for this process to initiate. When the soot accumulation reaches a level that is potentially damaging to the engine or the exhaust system, the solution involves a garage using a computer program to run a regeneration of the DPF manually using a diagnostic scan tool.

When a regeneration occurs, the soot is turned to gasses and ash of which some remains in the filter. This will increase restriction through the filter and can result in a blockage. Warnings are given to the driver before filter restriction causes an issue with driveability or damage to the engine or filter develop. Regular filter maintenance is a necessity to remove ash build up, either through cleaning or replacement of the filter.

Regeneration typically requires the vehicle to be driven continuously at 50-60mph (80-100km/h) for 30 to 45 minutes every few hundred miles/kilometers of city driving. Heavy duty pickup trucks have less stringent requirements for all three parameters, and Class 8 trucks significantly less. If the vehicle is often driven in cities the DPF may become clogged, causing a reduction in power and acceleration either passively due to increased exhaust pressure or actively due to vehicle going into "limp/turtle mode" as it tries to prevent engine and turbo damage. Once clogged both passive and active regeneration may become ineffective. DPF may be unclogged by high temperature pressure washing (not officially recommended) and/or burn-off oven.

== Safety ==
In 2011, Ford recalled 37,400 F-Series trucks with diesel engines after fuel and oil leaks caused fires in the diesel particulate filters of the trucks. No injuries occurred before the recall, though one grass fire was started. A similar recall was issued for 2005-2007 Jaguar S-Type and XJ diesels, where large amounts of soot became trapped in the DPF In affected vehicles, smoke and fire emanated from the vehicle underside, accompanied by flames from the rear of the exhaust. The heat from the fire could cause heating through the transmission tunnel to the interior, melting interior components and potentially causing interior fires.

== Regeneration ==
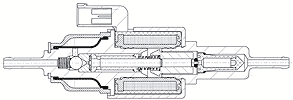
Metering pump for Diesel or additive injection, 3 L/h at 5 bar

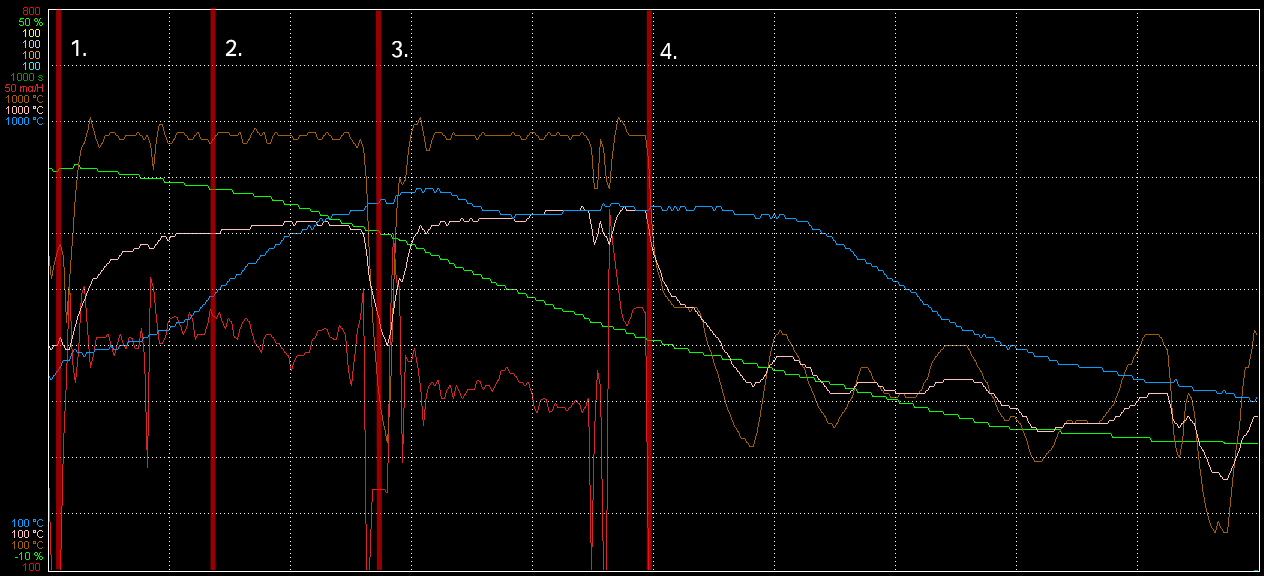
Diagram of the regeneration

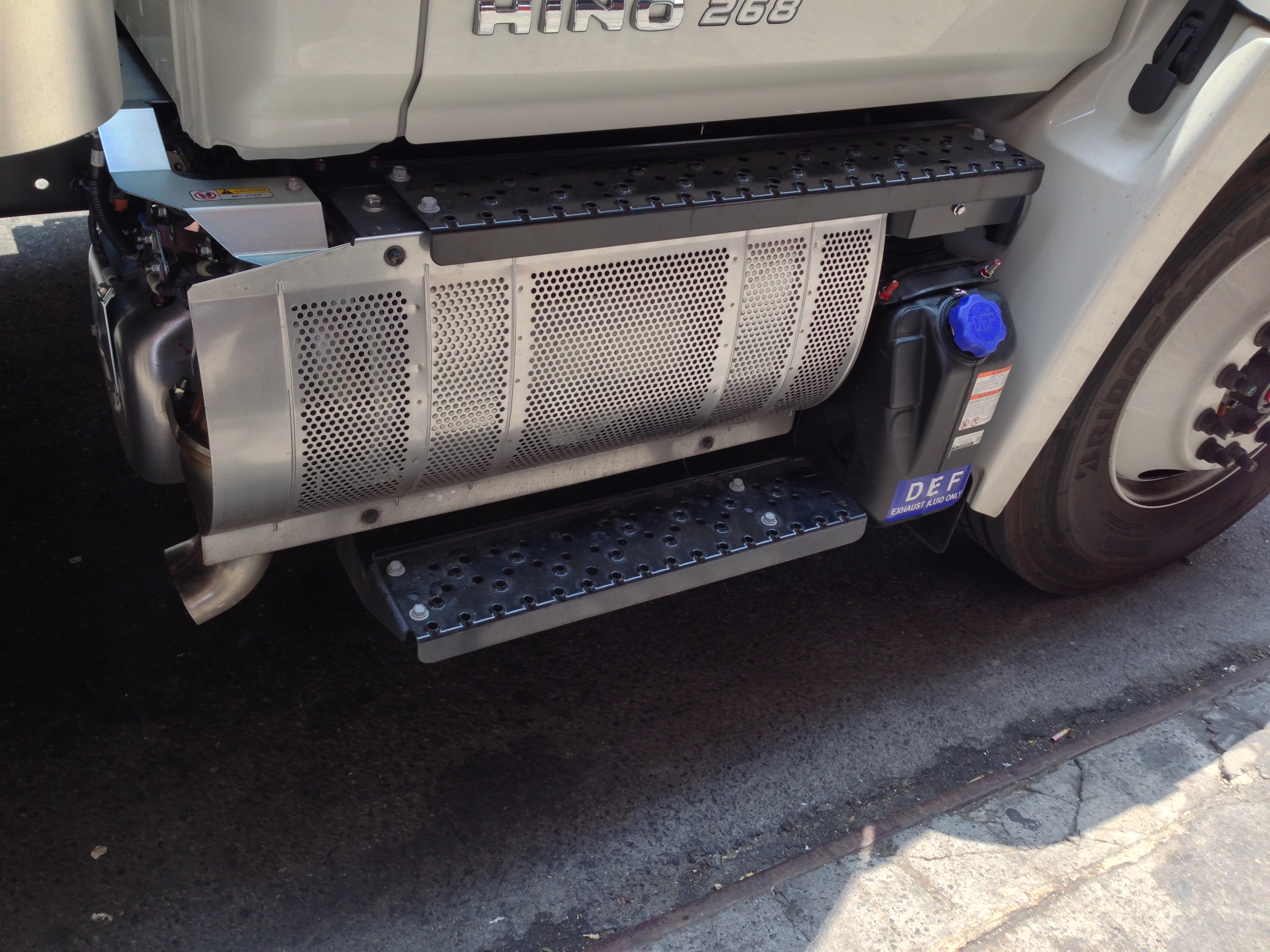
Hino truck and its selective catalytic reduction (SCR) next to the DPF with regeneration process by the late fuel injection to control exhaust temperature to burn off soot.

Regeneration is the process of burning off (oxidizing) the accumulated soot from the filter. This is done either passively (from the engine's exhaust heat in normal operation or by adding a catalyst to the filter) or actively introducing very high heat into the exhaust system. On-board active filter management can use a variety of strategies:

1. Engine management to increase exhaust temperature through late fuel injection or injection during the exhaust stroke
2. Use of a fuel-borne catalyst to reduce soot burn-out temperature
3. A fuel burner after the turbo to increase the exhaust temperature
4. A catalytic oxidizer to increase the exhaust temperature, with after injection (HC-Doser)
5. Resistive heating coils to increase the exhaust temperature
6. Microwave energy to increase the particulate temperature

All on-board active systems use extra fuel, whether through burning to heat the DPF, or providing extra power to the DPF's electrical system, although the use of a fuel borne catalyst reduces the energy required very significantly. Typically a computer monitors one or more sensors that measure back pressure and/or temperature, and based on pre-programmed set points the computer makes decisions on when to activate the regeneration cycle. The additional fuel can be supplied by a metering pump. Running the cycle too often while keeping the back pressure in the exhaust system low will result in high fuel consumption. Not running the regeneration cycle soon enough increases the risk of engine damage and/or uncontrolled regeneration (thermal runaway) and possible DPF failure.

Diesel particulate matter burns when temperatures above 600 °C are attained. This temperature can be reduced to somewhere in the range of 350 to 450 °C by use of a fuel-borne catalyst. The actual temperature of soot burn-out will depend on the chemistry employed. In the mid-2010s, scientists at 3M developed a magnesium doped version of traditional iron based catalysts which lowered the temperature required for particulate matter oxidation to just over 200 °C. The lower reaction temperature is made possible by the dopant allowing the Fe lattice to hold more oxygen. This advancement is significant because it allows the cleaning reaction to take place at the standard operating temperature of most diesel engines, removing the requirement for burning extra fuel or otherwise artificially heating the engine. The family of Mg doped catalysts, named Grindstaff catalysts after the chemist who started the work, has been the subject of much investigation across industry and academia with the tightening of emissions regulations on particulate matter world wide.

In some cases, in the absence of a fuel-borne catalyst, the combustion of the particulate matter can raise temperatures so high, that they are above the structural integrity threshold of the filter material, which can cause catastrophic failure of the substrate. Various strategies have been developed to limit this possibility. Note that unlike a spark-ignited engine, which typically has less than 0.5% oxygen in the exhaust gas stream before the emission control device(s), diesel engines have a very high ratio of oxygen available. While the amount of available oxygen makes fast regeneration of a filter possible, it also contributes to runaway regeneration problems.

Some applications use off-board regeneration. Off-board regeneration requires operator intervention (i.e. the machine is either plugged into a wall/floor mounted regeneration station, or the filter is removed from the machine and placed in the regeneration station). Off-board regeneration is not suitable for on-road vehicles, except in situations where the vehicles are parked in a central depot when not in use. Off-board regeneration is mainly used in industrial and mining applications. Coal mines (with the attendant explosion risk from coal damp) use off-board regeneration if non-disposable filters are installed, with the regeneration stations sited in an area where non-permissible machinery is allowed.

Many forklifts may also use off-board regeneration – typically mining machinery and other machinery that spend their operational lives in one location, which makes having a stationary regeneration station practical. In situations where the filter is physically removed from the machine for regeneration there is also the advantage of being able to inspect the filter core on a daily basis (DPF cores for non-road applications are typically sized to be usable for one shift – so regeneration is a daily occurrence).

== Removal or tampering ==
Intentionally removing or tampering with a DPF is prohibited by the EPA. The act of removing emission control devices, such as a DPF, is commonly referred to as "deleting." Several manufacturers and retailers of diesel emissions defeat devices have been fined up to $1 million.

== See also ==
- Air pollution
- Selective catalytic reduction
- Smog
- Ultra-low-sulfur diesel
