= Haze =

Dry particulates obscuring clarity of the sky

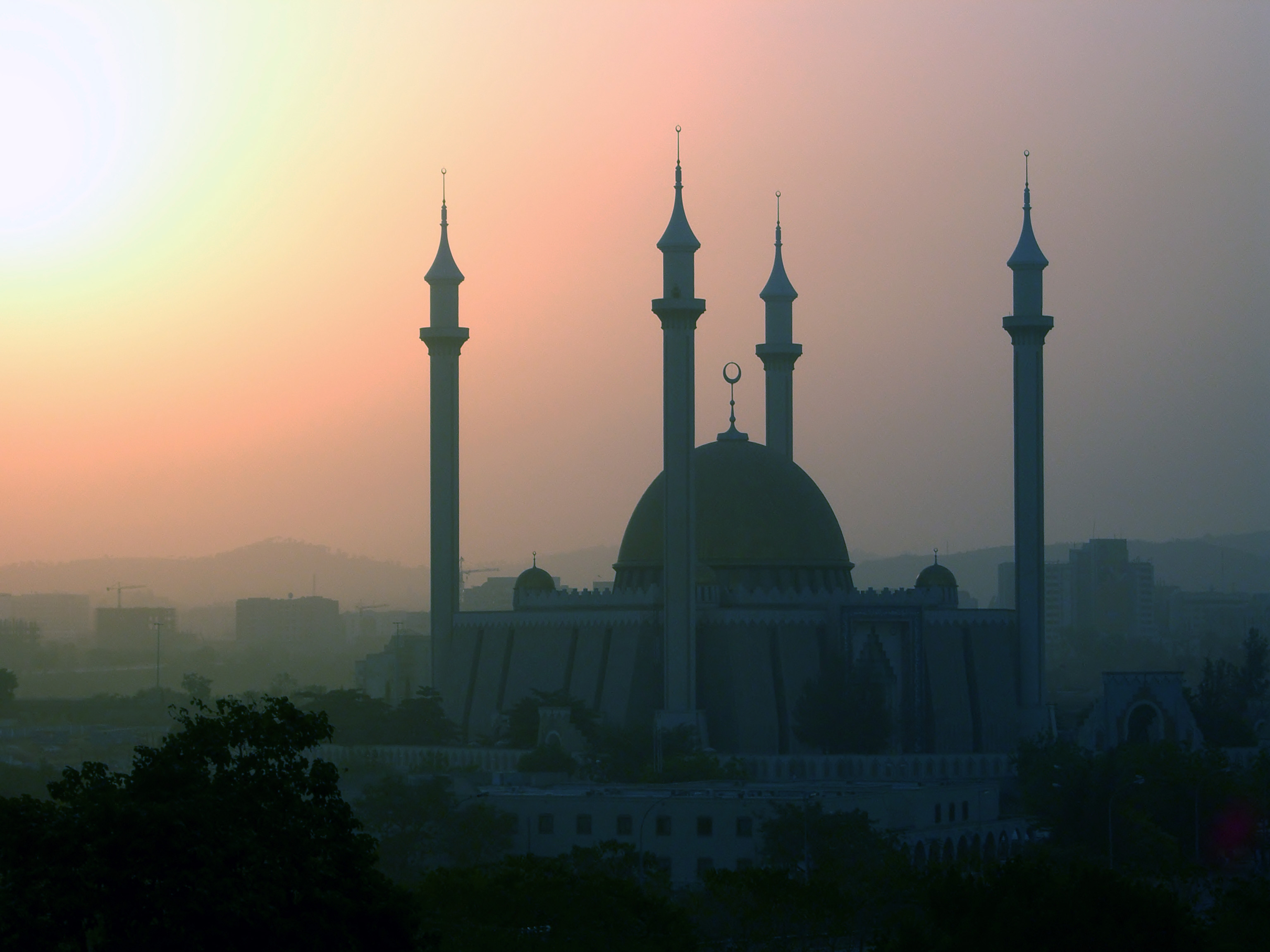
Harmattan Haze in Abuja

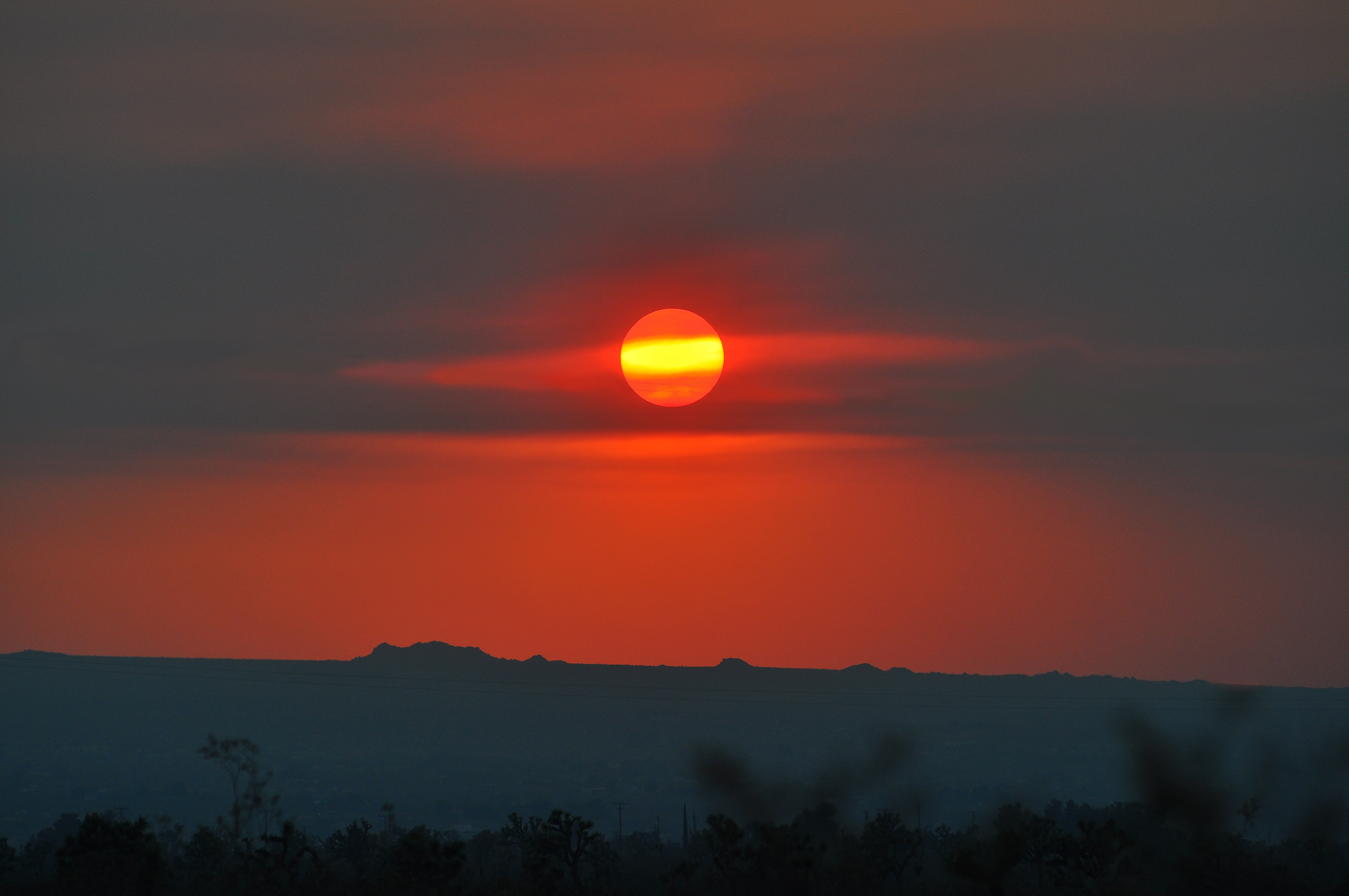
Haze over the Mojave Desert from a brush fire in Santa Barbara, California, seen as the Sun descends on the 2016 June solstice, allows the Sun to be photographed without a filter.

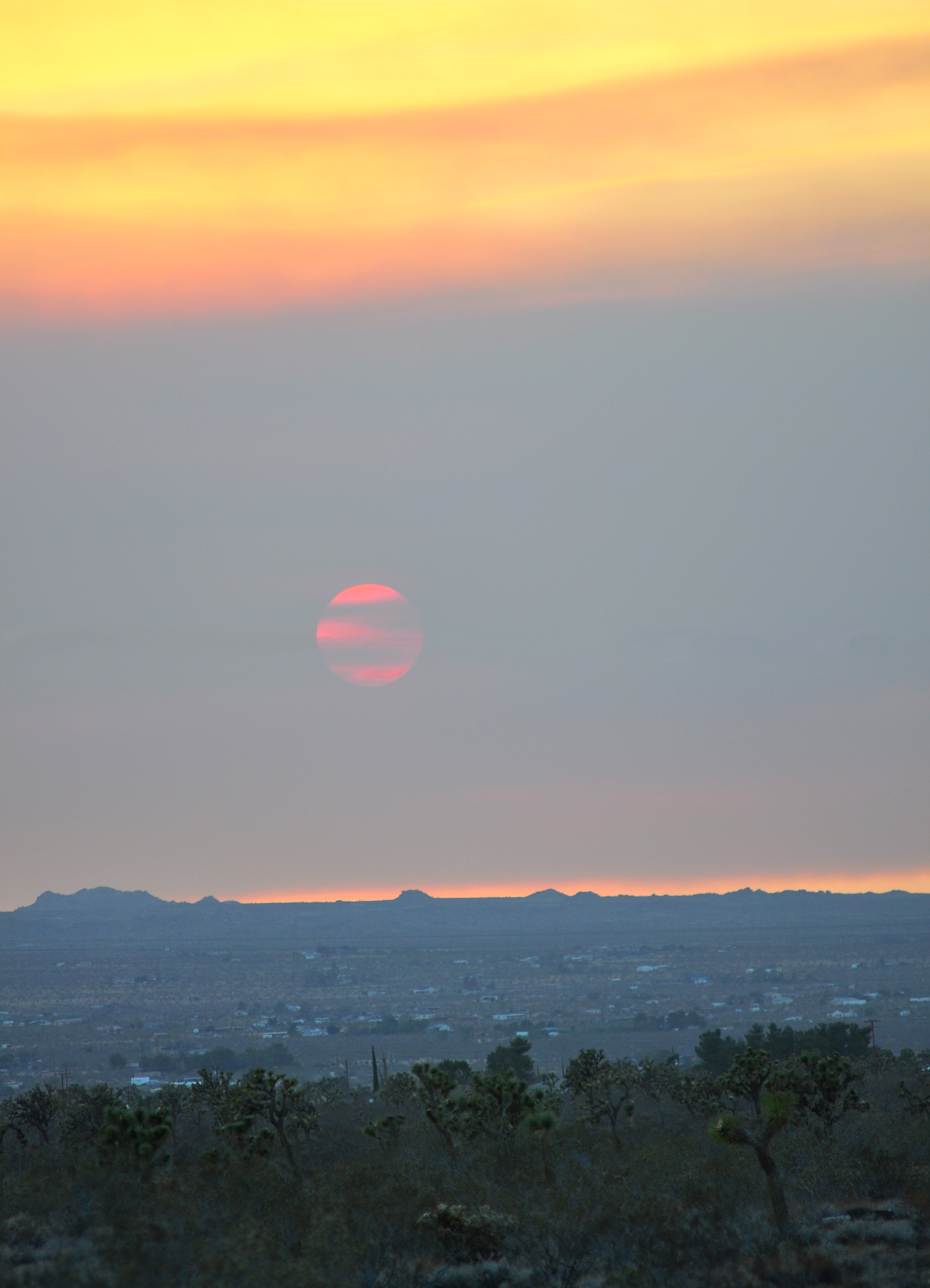
Haze as smoke pollution over the Mojave from fires in the Inland Empire, June 2016, demonstrates the loss of contrast to the Sun, and the landscape in general.

Haze is traditionally an atmospheric phenomenon in which dust, smoke, and other dry particulates suspended in air obscure visibility and the clarity of the sky. The World Meteorological Organization manual of codes includes a classification of particulates causing horizontal obscuration into categories of fog, ice fog, steam fog, mist, haze, smoke, volcanic ash, dust, sand, and snow. Sources for particles that cause haze include farming (stubble burning, ploughing in dry weather), traffic, industry, windy weather, volcanic activity and wildfires. Seen from afar (e.g. an approaching airplane) and depending on the direction of view with respect to the Sun, haze may appear brownish or bluish, while mist tends to be bluish grey instead. Whereas haze often is considered a phenomenon occurring in dry air, mist formation is a phenomenon in saturated, humid air. However, haze particles may act as condensation nuclei that leads to the subsequent vapor condensation and formation of mist droplets; such forms of haze are known as "wet haze".

In meteorological literature, the word haze is generally used to denote visibility-reducing aerosols of the wet type suspended in the atmosphere. Such aerosols commonly arise from complex chemical reactions that occur as sulfur dioxide gases emitted during combustion are converted into small droplets of sulfuric acid when exposed. The reactions are enhanced in the presence of sunlight, high relative humidity, and an absence of air flow (wind). A small component of wet-haze aerosols appear to be derived from compounds released by trees when burning, such as terpenes. For all these reasons, wet haze tends to be primarily a warm-season phenomenon. Large areas of haze covering many thousands of kilometers may be produced under extensive favorable conditions each summer.

== Air pollution ==
Haze often occurs when suspended dust and smoke particles accumulate in relatively dry air. When weather conditions block the dispersal of smoke and other pollutants they concentrate and form a usually low-hanging shroud that impairs visibility and may become a respiratory health threat if excessively inhaled. Industrial pollution can result in dense haze, which is known as smog.

Since 1991, haze has been a particularly acute problem in Southeast Asia. The main source of the haze has been smoke from fires occurring in Sumatra and Borneo which dispersed over a wide area. In response to the 1997 Southeast Asian haze, the ASEAN countries agreed on a Regional Haze Action Plan (1997) as an attempt to reduce haze. In 2002, all ASEAN countries signed the Agreement on Transboundary Haze Pollution, but the pollution is still a problem there today. Under the agreement, the ASEAN secretariat hosts a co-ordination and support unit. During the 2013 Southeast Asian haze, Singapore experienced a record high pollution level, with the 3-hour Pollutant Standards Index reaching a record high of 401.

In the United States, the Interagency Monitoring of Protected Visual Environments (IMPROVE) program was developed as a collaborative effort between the US EPA and the National Park Service in order to establish the chemical composition of haze in National Parks and establish air pollution control measures in order to restore the visibility of the air to pre-industrial levels. Additionally, the Clean Air Act requires that any current visibility problems be addressed and remedied, and future visibility problems be prevented, in 156 Class I Federal areas located throughout the United States. A full list of these areas is available on EPA's website.

In addition to the severe health issues caused by haze from air pollution, dust storm particles, and bush fire smoke, reduction in irradiance is the most dominant impact of these sources of haze and a growing issue for photovoltaic production as the solar industry grows. Smog also lowers agricultural yield and it has been proposed that pollution controls could increase agricultural production in China. These effects are negative for both sides of agrivoltaics (the combination of photovoltaic electricity production and food from agriculture).

=== International disputes ===
==== Transboundary haze ====
Haze is no longer just a confined domestic problem. It has become one of the causes of international disputes among neighboring countries. Haze can migrate to adjacent countries in the path of wind and thereby pollutes other countries as well, even if haze does not first manifest there. One of the most recent problems occur in Southeast Asia which largely affects the nations of Indonesia, Malaysia and Singapore. In 2013, due to forest fires in Indonesia, Kuala Lumpur and surrounding areas became shrouded in a pall of noxious fumes dispersed from Indonesia, that brings a smell of ash and coal for more than a week, in the country's worst environmental crisis since 1997.

The main sources of the haze are Indonesia's Sumatra Island, Indonesian areas of Borneo, and Riau, where farmers, plantation owners and miners have set hundreds of fires in the forests to clear land during dry weather. Winds blew most of the particulates and fumes across the narrow Strait of Malacca to Malaysia, although parts of Indonesia in the path are also affected. The 2015 Southeast Asian haze was another major crisis of air quality, although there were occasions such as the 2006 and 2019 haze which were less impactful than the three major Southeast Asian haze of 1997, 2013 and 2015.

== Obscuration ==
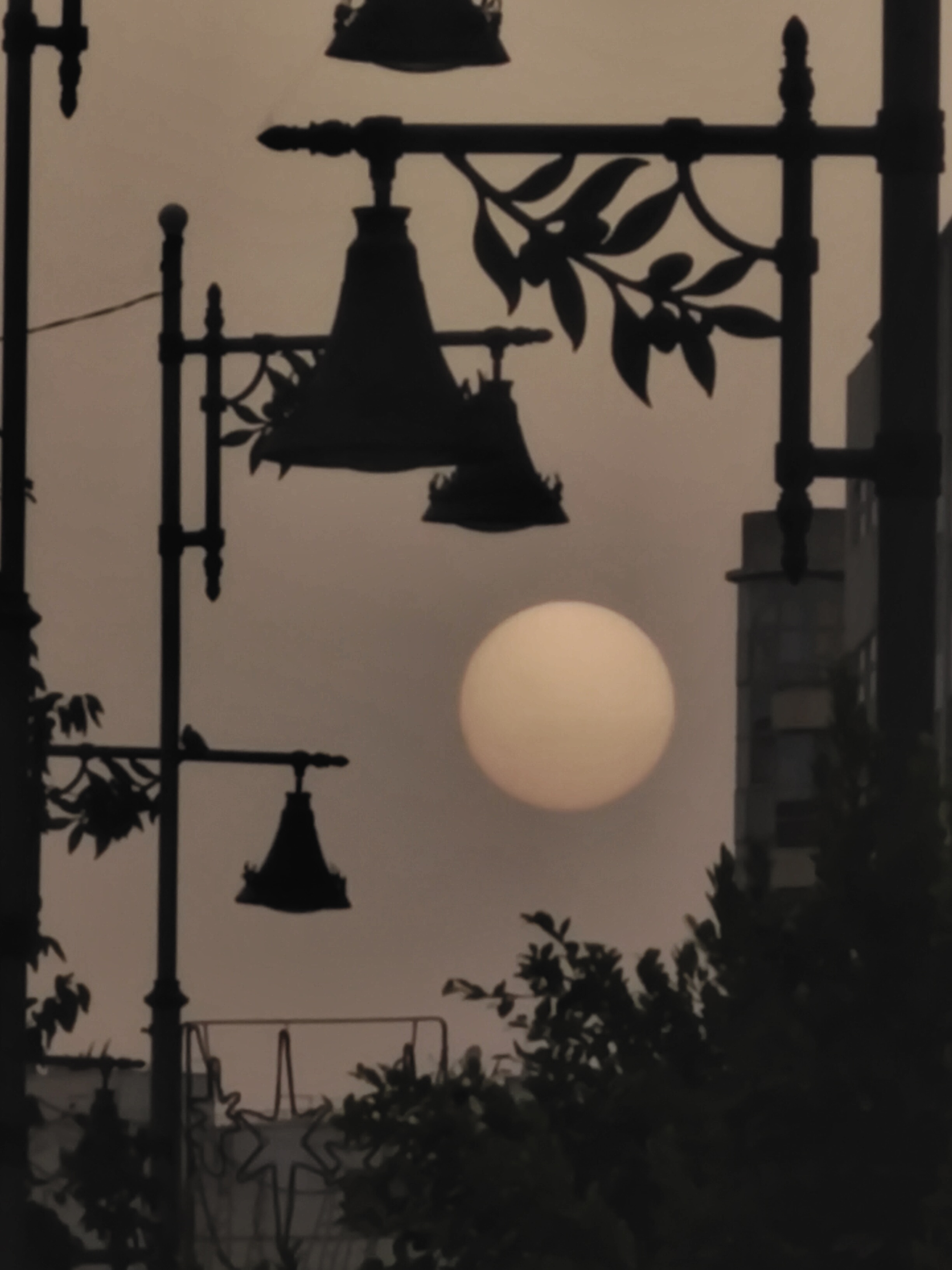
The sun viewed directly through a thick haze of atmospheric dust in Meknes, Morocco

Haze causes issues in the area of terrestrial photography and imaging, where the penetration of large amounts of dense atmosphere may be necessary to image distant subjects. This results in the visual effect of a loss of contrast in the subject, due to the effect of light scattering and reflection through the haze particles. For these reasons, sunrise and sunset colors and possibly the sun itself appear subdued on hazy days, and stars may be obscured by haze at night. In some cases, attenuation by haze is so great that, toward sunset, the sun disappears altogether before even reaching the horizon.

Haze can be defined as an aerial form of the Tyndall effect therefore unlike other atmospheric effects such as cloud, mist and fog, haze is spectrally selective in accordance to the electromagnetic spectrum: shorter (blue) wavelengths are scattered more, and longer (red/infrared) wavelengths are scattered less. For this reason, many super-telephoto lenses often incorporate yellow light filters or coatings to enhance image contrast. Infrared (IR) imaging may also be used to penetrate haze over long distances, with a combination of IR-pass optical filters and IR-sensitive detectors at the intended destination.

== See also ==
- Arctic haze
- ASEAN Agreement on Transboundary Haze Pollution
- Asian brown cloud
- Asian Dust
- Coefficient of haze
- Convention on Long-Range Transboundary Air Pollution
- Fog
- Mist
- Saharan Air Layer
- Southeast Asian haze
- Smog
- Trail Smelter dispute
