= 1966 New York City smog =

Air-pollution episode in New York City

- On November 25, 1966, the front page of The New York Times featured this photograph by Neal Boenzi. Taken the morning before, the photo shows a view facing south from the Empire State Building. Roy Popkin of the EPA said the "surrealistic" image made Lower Manhattan look like a science-fiction "Cloud City".
- Date: November 23–26, 1966
- Location: Acute smog in New York City; lesser smog throughout the New York metropolitan area; 40.713°N 74.006°W
- Cause: Heat inversion over East Coast
- Casualties: 168 (estimate from 1967 medical study)

The 1966 New York City smog was a major air-pollution episode and environmental disaster, coinciding with that year's Thanksgiving holiday weekend. Smog covered the city and its surrounding area from November 23 to 26, filling the city's air with damaging levels of several toxic pollutants. It was the third major smog in New York City, following events of similar scale in 1953 and 1963.

On November 23, a large mass of stagnant air over the East Coast trapped pollutants in the city's air. For three days, New York City was engulfed in dangerously high levels of carbon monoxide, sulfur dioxide, smoke, and haze. Pockets of air pollution pervaded the greater New York metropolitan area, including parts of New Jersey and Connecticut. By November 25, the smog became severe enough that regional leaders announced a "first-stage alert". During the alert, leaders of local and state governments asked residents and industry to take voluntary steps to minimize emissions. Health officials advised people with respiratory or heart conditions to remain indoors. The city shut off garbage incinerators, requiring massive hauling of garbage to landfills. A cold front dispersed the smog on November 26, and the alert ended.

In the months that followed, medical researchers studied the smog's impact on health. City officials initially maintained that the smog had not caused any deaths, but it soon became clear that the smog had significantly harmed public health. A study published in December 1966 estimated that 10% of the city's population had suffered adverse health effects, such as stinging eyes, coughing, and respiratory distress. A statistical analysis published in October 1967 found that 168 deaths had likely been caused by the smog.

The smog catalyzed greater national awareness of air pollution as a serious health problem and a political issue. The government of New York City updated local laws on air-pollution control. Prompted by the smog, President Lyndon B. Johnson and members of Congress worked to pass federal legislation regulating air pollution in the United States, culminating in the 1967 Air Quality Act and the 1970 Clean Air Act. The extent of harms from subsequent pollution events, including the health effects of pollution from the September 11 attacks and incidents of pollution in China, have been judged by reference to the 1966 smog in New York.

== Background ==
=== Smog in general and types of smog ===
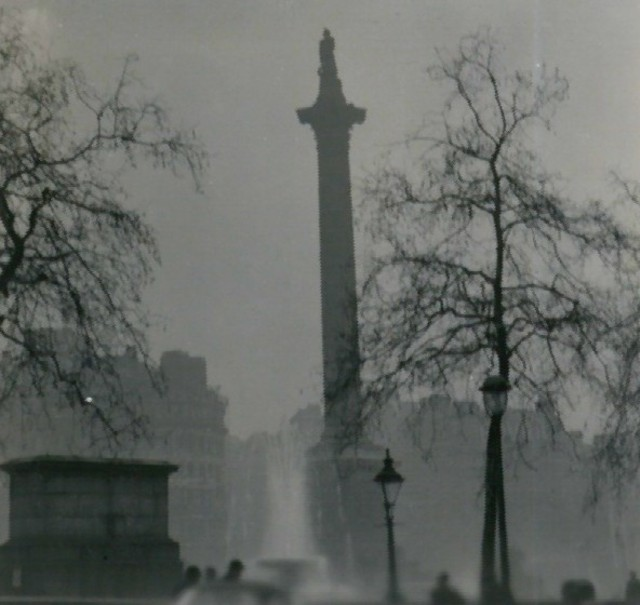
Great Smog of London, 1952

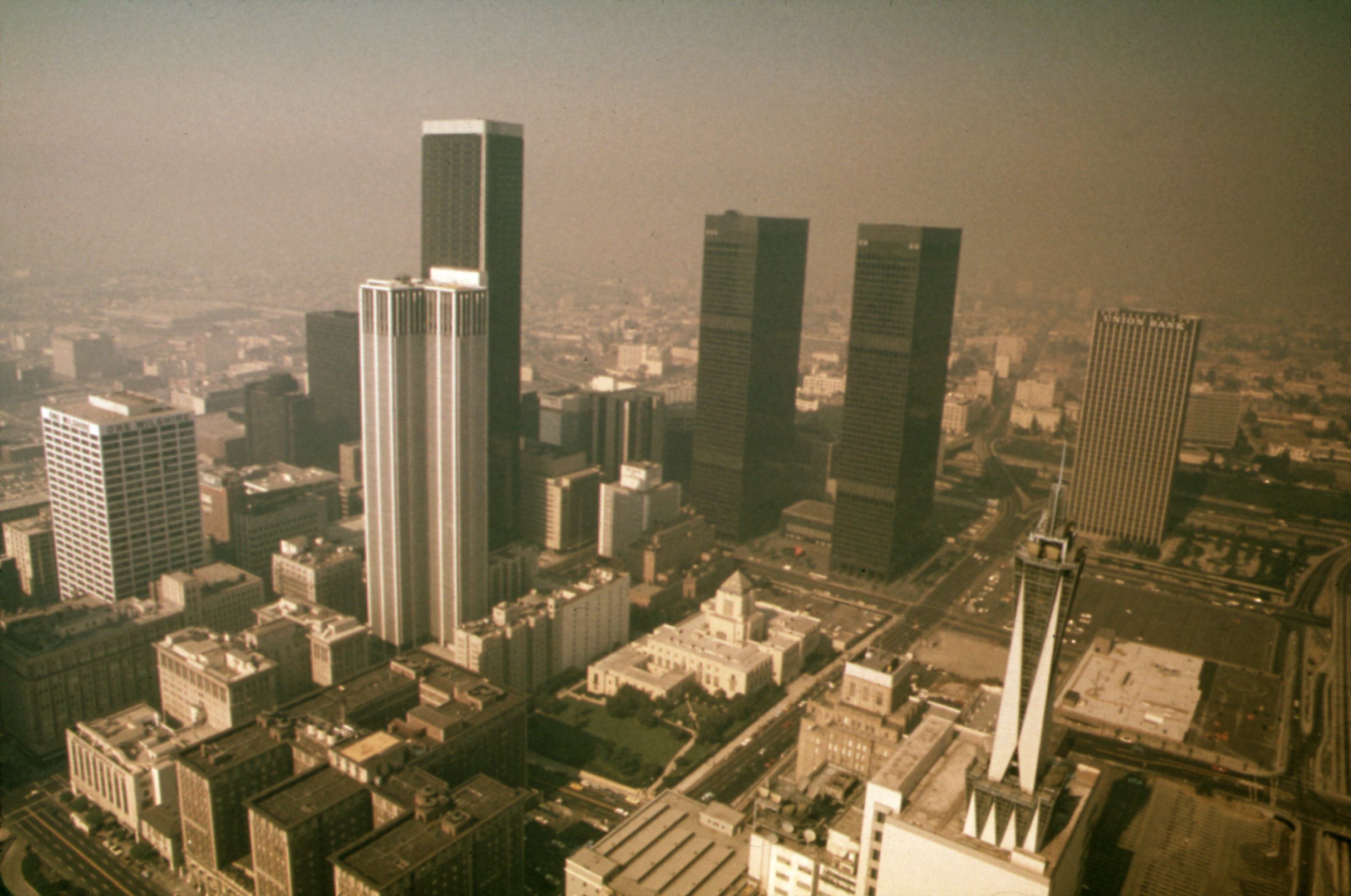
Smog over Los Angeles, 1973

The word "smog" (a portmanteau of "smoke" and "fog") is used to describe several forms of air pollution commonly found in urban and industrialized areas. There are several ways to define and categorize types of smog, with some sources defining two main types of smog: smoky "London Pea soup"-style smog and hazy "Los Angeles"-style smog.

- London smog describes particulate matter (for example sulfur dioxide, smoke, and soot) from stationary industrial sources (typically coal combustion from industrial chimneys) mixing with naturally occurring fog.
- Los Angeles smog, or photochemical smog, results from the combustion of petroleum (and other petrochemicals) and emission of exhaust gas, usually by motor vehicles and petrochemical plants. More precisely, photochemical smog is the product of "secondary" pollutants (ozone, oxidants) that form when hydrocarbons (or volatile organic compounds), carbon monoxide, nitrogen oxides, and other chemicals react together in sunlight. Photochemical smog arrived in modern cities in the 1940s and 1950s with the popularization of motor vehicles and development of new power plants.

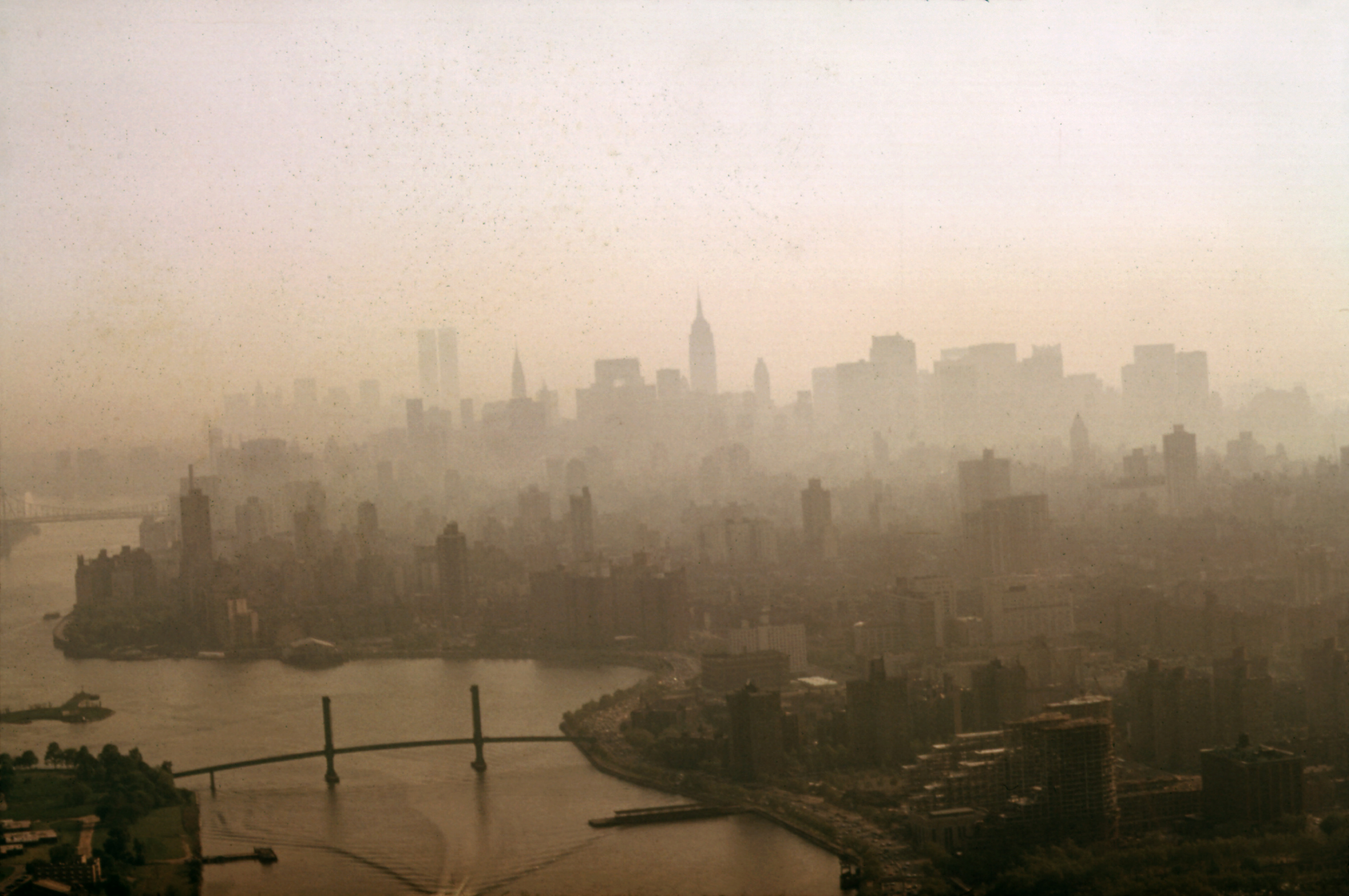
May 1973 photo of East River and Manhattan skyline in heavy smog

London smog and Los Angeles smog are not exclusive to their namesake cities by any means. They are found in urban areas throughout the world, and both types of smog are commonly found intermingled within the same region. At the time of the 1966 smog—and for two decades prior—air pollution in New York City combined the characteristics of London smog and Los Angeles smog. The city's smog in that period was caused by a combination of stationary sources, such as industrial coal-burning, and mobile sources, such as motor vehicles.

Although smog is generally a chronic condition, unfavorable weather conditions and excessive pollutants can cause intense concentrations of smog that can cause acute illness and death. Because of their unusual visibility and lethality, these intense smog events have often been publicized in the media. In news reports, acute smogs have historically been characterized as disasters or, more specifically, environmental disasters. An acute "smog event" may also be called simply "a smog", a smog "episode", or a "killer smog" (if it caused, or had the potential to cause, deaths).

=== Smog in the United States and New York City before 1966 ===
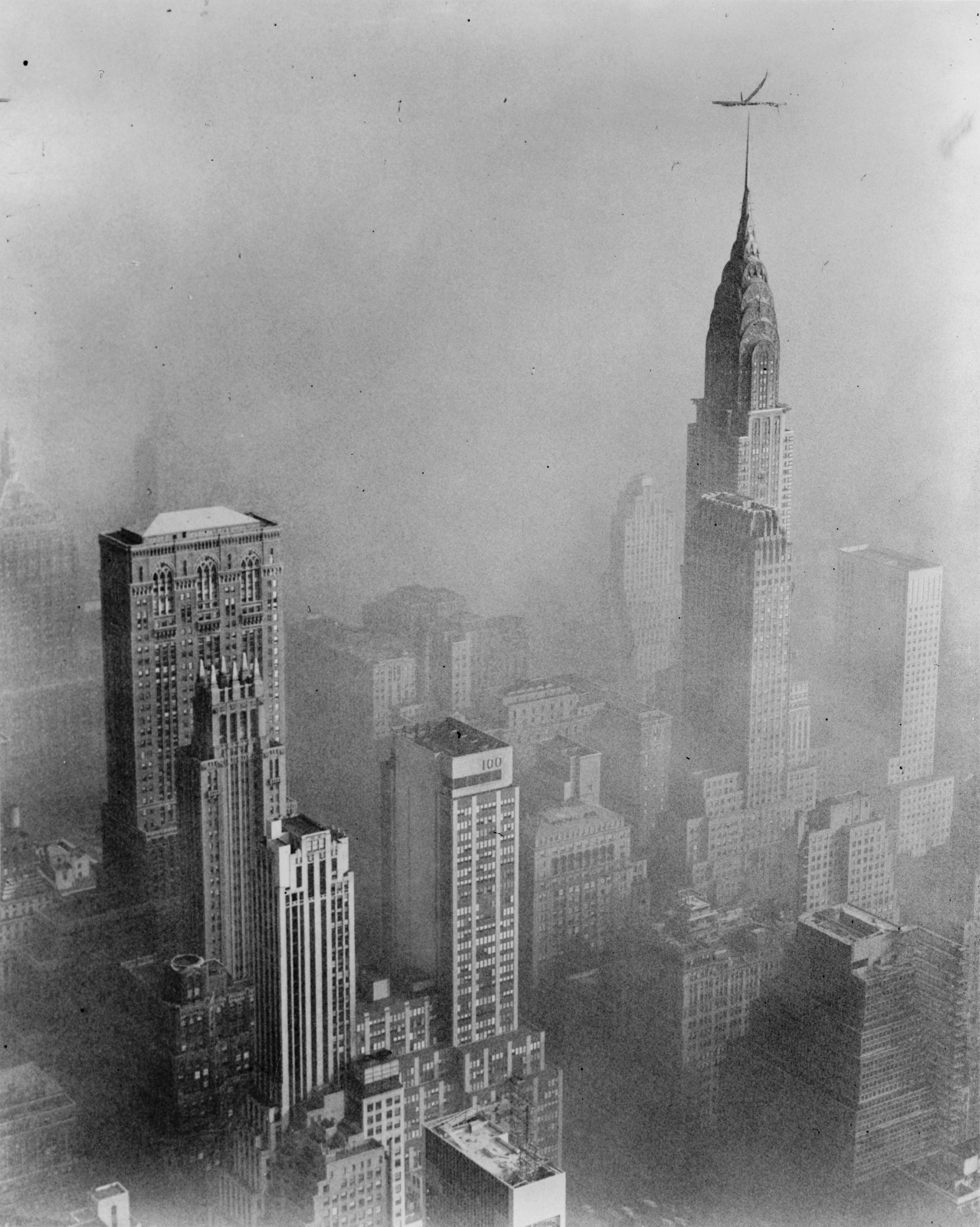
A view toward the Chrysler Building from the Empire State Building amid the six-day smog of November 1953, estimated to have caused at least 200 deaths.

Even before the 1966 smog episode, scientists, city officials, and the general public recognized that New York City—and most other major American cities—had serious air-pollution problems. According to scientific studies from the period, more than 60 metropolitan areas in the US suffered from "extremely serious air pollution problems", and "probably no American city of more than [50,000] inhabitants enjoys clean air the year round." The air "over much of the eastern half of the country [was] chronically polluted", and the nation's most-polluted population centers were New York City, Chicago, Los Angeles, St. Louis, and Philadelphia.

New York City's pre-1966 air pollution was reportedly the worst of any American city. Although the "persistently glaring" photochemical smog of Los Angeles was more visible, more "infamous," and subject to a greater degree of public attention, New York City had more total emissions and many more emissions proportional to its land area. However, New York's surrounding landscape and climate were naturally conducive to atmospheric circulation, which ordinarily prevented high concentration of smog within the city. As such, the problem was mostly invisible most of the time. While Los Angeles is surrounded by mountains that tend to trap airborne pollutants, New York City's open topography and favorable wind conditions usually disperse pollutants before they can form concentrated smog. If a city with the climate and landscape of Los Angeles had had the high emissions of mid-1960s New York, rapid accumulation of airborne pollutants would have quickly rendered it uninhabitable.

New York's smog event of 1966 was preceded by two other major episodes: the first in November 1953, the second in January–February 1963. (Note: Sources differ on the timing of the 1963 smog. It is variously described as occurring in January–February, October, or November, and it is possible that minor smog events occurred during those months. January–February is most likely to be the correct time for that year's most significant smog event, because it is the period Dr. Leonard Greenburg identified in his study of significant excess deaths caused by smog. The 1963 smog is sometimes inaccurately described as occurring in 1962; other sources list a 1962 smog as a fourth major New York City smog, alongside the smogs of 1953, 1963, and 1966. There was a smog event in November 1962, but Greenburg's studies found it had not resulted in significant excess deaths.) Medical scientists led by Leonard Greenburg compared the number of deaths recorded during periods of acute smog with the number of deaths from the same time in other years. Based on their statistical analysis, Greenburg's team determined that the smogs coincided with excess deaths. (Note: The term "excess deaths," or mortality displacement, refers to a statistically significant, temporary increase above the expected mortality rate in a given population over a given period of time. In Greenburg's studies on mortality during New York City smog events, the method to measure excess deaths was to compare the expected number of deaths and the actual number of deaths for a particular period. Where the actual number of deaths significantly exceeds the expected number, it can be inferred that a major event that occurred at the same time (such as a heat wave or, in this case, a smog event) caused or contributed to the excess deaths.) Greenburg inferred that the smog caused or contributed to those deaths. An estimated 220–240 deaths were caused by the six-day 1953 smog; an estimated 300–405 deaths were caused by the two-week 1963 smog. Other minor episodes of smog occurred in the city before 1966, but they were not accompanied by statistically significant excess deaths.

=== City air monitoring ===
Harlem Courthouse (New York City)

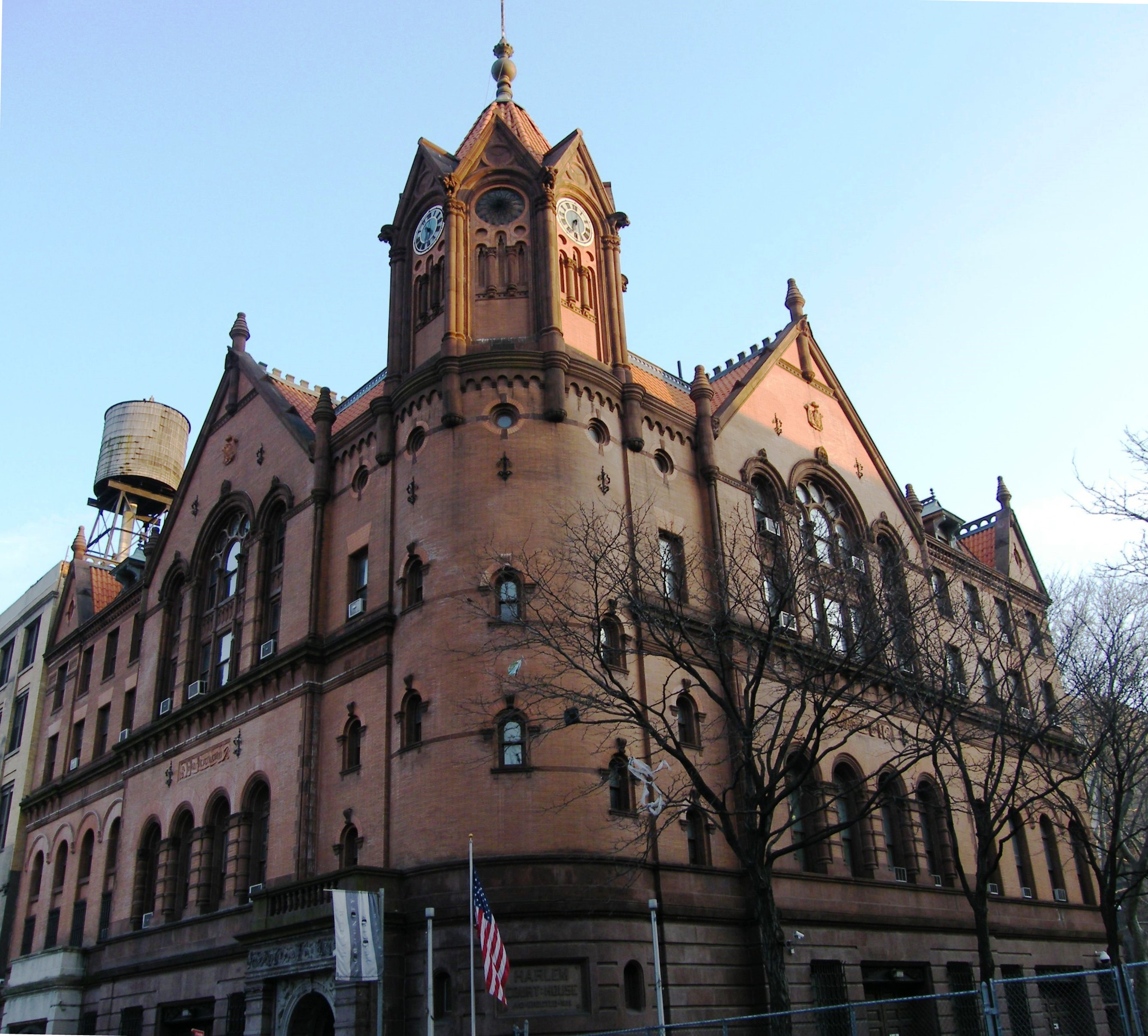
In 1966, New York City had only a single air quality measurement station: the Harlem Courthouse (pictured in 2009).

In 1953, the city opened a laboratory to monitor pollution that would become its Department of Air Pollution Control. At the time of the 1966 smog, air quality measurements were recorded from only a single station, the Harlem Courthouse building on East 121st Street, run by Braverman and his staff of 15. Taking measurements from a single station meant that the index reflected conditions in the immediately surrounding area, but served as a crude, unrepresentative gauge of overall air quality across the entire city. The Interstate Sanitation Commission, a regional agency run by New York, New Jersey, and Connecticut and headquartered at Columbus Circle, also relied on the Harlem Courthouse laboratory. Formed in 1936, the advisory agency was authorized in 1962 by New York and New Jersey to oversee air pollution issues.

The department quantified pollution using an air quality index (AQI), a single number based on combined measurements of several pollutants. AQI measurements in the United States are now standardized and overseen by the EPA, but in the 1960s, local governments in different regions used "a confusing and scientifically inconsistent array of air quality reporting methods".

By 1964, the Department of Air Pollution Control had developed an AQI called the SCS Air Pollution Index (SCS API), combining measurements of sulfur dioxide (SO_{2}), carbon monoxide (CO), and coefficient of haze (also called smoke shade) into a single number. The city laboratory recorded the presence of those three pollutants measured in amount (by concentration in the air) and duration. SO_{2} and CO were measured by parts-per-million (ppm) and smoke shade was measured in millions of particles per cubic foot (mppcf). The department continuously monitored these pollutant levels and recorded the hourly averages. The data for those three pollutants were combined into a single number using a weighted formula developed by department co-founder Moe Mordecai Braverman. The SCS API formula was as follows:

(SO_{2} ppm × 20) + (CO ppm × 1) + (Smoke mppcf × 2) = SCS API

The index average was 12, with an "emergency" level if the index was higher than 50 for a 24-hour period. The average of 12 was determined from data collected between 1957 and 1964 showing average levels of 0.18 ppm SO_{2}, 3 ppm CO, and 2.7 mppcf smoke levels. (Note: Using the SCS API formula, the average had been calculated based on these measurements: (0.18 × 20) + (3 × 1) + (2.7 × 2) = 12 SCS API) The "emergency" level of 50 was announced in 1964. The index system used by the city in 1966 is not in use anywhere today and was unique to the city even at the time; the 1966 smog itself prompted scientists to reexamine and improve the city's methodology for recording air-pollutant levels.

Using the SCS API, the city adopted an air-pollution alert system with three stages of alert, matching increasingly severe levels of pollution with corresponding counteractions. The city announced its only first-stage alert in 1966; second- and third-stage alerts were never reached.

New York's SCS API alert system in use in 1966
Alert level	Measurements			SCS API	Required conditions to trigger alert	Counteractions
Alert level	SO_{2} (ppm)	CO (ppm)	Smoke (mppcf)	SCS API	Required conditions to trigger alert	Counteractions
First-stage alert	0.7	10	7.5	39 [50]	Total SCS API exceeds 39 for four hours and the Weather Bureau predicts the inversion will last another 36 hours. Although 39 was the "official" SCS API level required to trigger a first-stage alert, 50 was set as the level actually used in practice.	The city government would ask residents to voluntarily reduce their fuel consumption and car use.
Second-stage alert	1.5	20	9.0	68	Total SCS API exceeds 68 for two hours.	The city would ban the use of fuel oil, sets a cap on industrial emissions, and asks New Yorkers to stop all transportation—on a voluntary basis—unless essential.
Third-stage alert	2.0	30	10.0	90	Total SCS API exceeds 90 for one hour.	The city would impose mandatory "brownout" conditions, placing a curfew on lighting and heating and curtailing all but "essential" transportation and industry.

Braverman later admitted that the "emergency" alert level of 50 SCS API had been chosen on an essentially arbitrary basis. After the department determined the average level of smog in the city was 12, Braverman said,

No one knew what to do next ... so I just said, "If it's four times as high, that's an emergency."

Another defect of the SCS API alert system was that it relied on a balance of multiple pollutants but would disregard fatal levels of any one pollutant under certain conditions. Critics pointed out that the index could have potentially allowed the city to reach lethal concentrations of carbon monoxide without triggering any alert at all, so long as the levels of other pollutants remained low. The department acknowledged the SCS API's flaws and later said it had been implemented for lack of a clearly superior alternative. When the system had been adopted, there were no generally accepted standards or best practices for recording air pollution.

=== Warnings ===
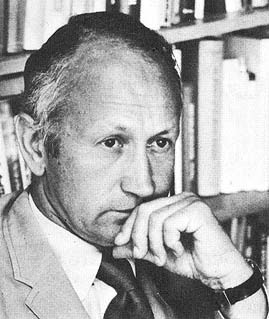
A task force headed by Norman Cousins (pictured c. 1976) warned that the pollution in New York City was excessive and "could become a gas chamber" in the wrong weather conditions.

In 1963, Helmut F. Landsberg—a climate scientist with the federal Weather Bureau—predicted that the Northeastern and Great Lakes regions could anticipate a major smog event every three years due to the confluence of weather events and trends like growing population, industrialization, and increased emissions from cars and central heating. In early 1966, Dr. Walter Orr Roberts—director of the National Center for Atmospheric Research—warned of the imminent threat of a smog event with the potential to kill as many as 10,000 people. Roberts identified Los Angeles and New York City as the cities most potentially vulnerable to a large-scale lethal smog in the United States, and further named London, Hamburg, or Santiago as the other most vulnerable cities internationally. Asked if "many" American cities were vulnerable to a disaster smog event, Roberts replied: "Yes. I have been worried that we would wake up some morning to an unusual meteorological situation that prevented the air from circulating and that we might find thousands of people dead as the result of the air they were forced to breathe in that smog situation."

The same year, the New York mayor's office established a 10-member task force headed by Norman Cousins (known as the editor of the weekly magazine Saturday Review) to study the problem of air pollution. The task force published a 102-page report in May 1963, finding that the city had the most polluted air of any major city in the United States, with a wider range and greater total tonnage of pollutants than Los Angeles. The task force criticized the city for lax enforcement of pollution laws, even naming the city itself the biggest violator, with municipal garbage incinerators "operat[ing] in almost constant violation" of its own laws. The report warned "all the ingredients now exist for an air-pollution disaster of major proportions" and that the city "could become a gas chamber" in the wrong weather conditions.

A July 1966 report by the New York Academy of Medicine Committee on Public Health cautioned that New York City's air-pollution problem made it susceptible to acute, lethal episodes. The academy recommended a reduction of air pollution. Further, their report cautioned that it was unlikely scientists had identified every harmful pollutant in the air or the full range of health effects that could be caused by air pollution.

== Timeline of smog event ==
=== Air quality measurements, November 19–30 ===
The following charts show the daily mean values of sulfur dioxide, carbon monoxide, and smoke measurements in New York City from November 19–30, 1966.

View source data.
View source data.
View source data.

=== November 19–23: stagnant air traps pollutants ===
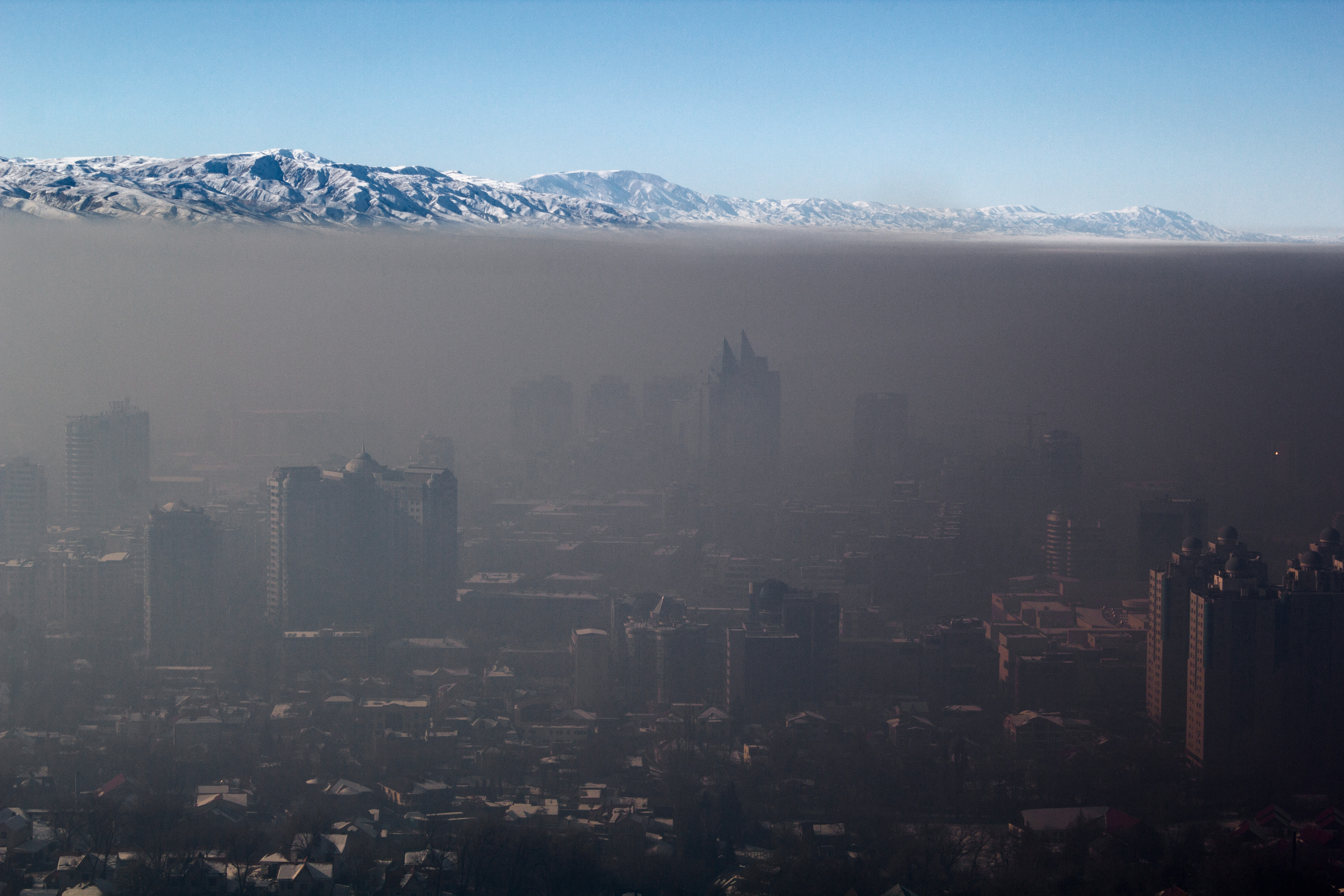
Smog trapped under an inversion in Almaty, Kazakhstan—similar to the atmospheric conditions of the 1966 New York City smog.

In November 1966, New York City was experiencing an unseasonably warm "Indian summer". A cold front from Canada brought clean air to the city on November 19, but the cold front was held in place by pressure from the higher atmosphere. An anticyclonic temperature inversion—in other words, a warm, mostly stationary air mass located atop a cooler air mass—formed over the East Coast on November 20.

Unlike atmospheric convection—the ordinary process of lower, warm air rising—inversions leave cooler air suspended below warm air, preventing the lower air from rising and trapping airborne pollutants that would ordinarily disperse in the atmosphere. Such weather events are common, but they are usually followed by a strong cold front that brings an influx of clean air and disperses pollutants before they have enough time to become highly concentrated; in this case, a cold front approaching west through southern Canada was delayed. When explained in less formal terms, the process of an inversion causing a smog event has been compared to a lid that holds in pollutants or a balloon that fills with pollutants. In general, smog events occur not because of a sudden increase in a region's output of pollution, but rather because weather conditions like stagnant air prevent the dispersal of pollutants that were already present.

The inversion prevented air pollutants from rising, thereby trapping them within the city. The smog event itself started on Wednesday November 23, coinciding with the beginning of the long Thanksgiving weekend. The material sources of the smog were particulates and chemicals from factories, chimneys, and vehicles. Sulfur dioxide levels rose and smoke shade—a measure of visibility interference in the atmosphere—was two to three times higher than usual.

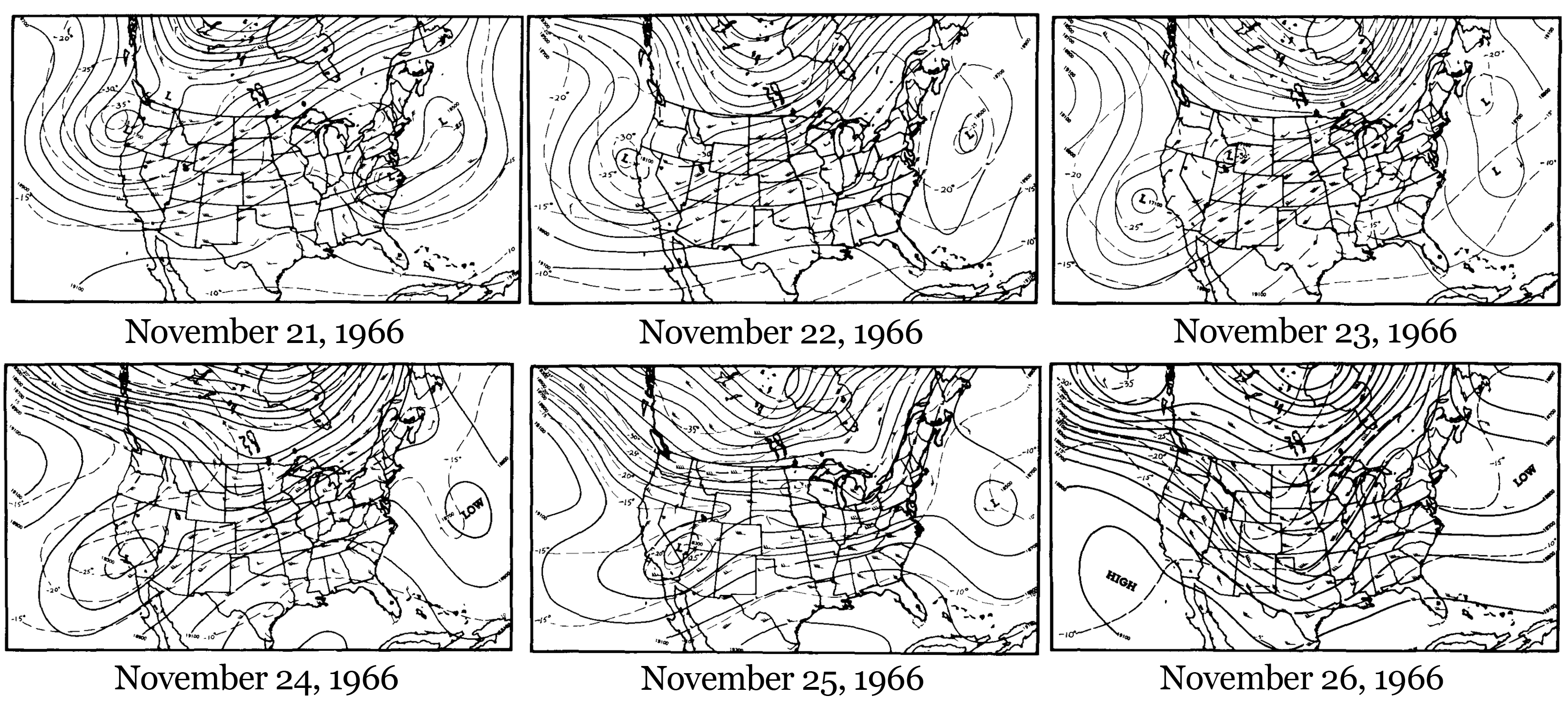
These weather maps show winds at 18,000 feet from November 21–26, 1966. A mass of warm air spreading east and south above the East Coast created the inversion that trapped pollutants near the ground.

=== November 24: Thanksgiving Day ===
We were flying at about two thousand feet, through a curiously greasy-looking and pervasive haze. The ground could just be made out below—cars, roads, houses, all dim but visible.

Then we began to climb. In less than a minute the ground had vanished. Cars, roads, houses, the very earth itself had been blotted out. We were circling in bright sunlight, above an apparently limitless bank of opaque, polluted air. The smog extended to the horizon in every direction. At a distance, the slanting rays of the sun gave it a coppery, rather handsome appearance. Nearer at hand it merely looked yellow and ugly, like nothing so much as a vast and unappetizing sea of chicken soup.

— William Wise, describing his view from an airplane delayed in landing at John F. Kennedy International Airport. Wise was returning from London, where he had been researching the 1952 Great Smog of London.

The city chose not to declare a smog alert on Thanksgiving Day, but The New York Times later reported that city officials had been "on the verge" of calling an alert. Austin Heller, the city's commissioner of air pollution control, said he nearly declared a first-stage alert between 6 a.m. and 10 a.m. on November 24. (Note: Another spokesperson for the city clarified Heller's comments to the press, noting that the required pollution levels for a first-stage alert were not reached at any time that morning and the Weather Bureau's forecast at the time had predicted the inversion would pass in only 24 hours, not the 36 hours required to trigger an alert. Heller, said the decision had been a "very, very close" one.) Heller said the index had reached a high of 60.6–10 points higher than the "emergency" mark—between 8 and 9 p.m., and the 60.6 reading was possibly the highest in the city's history. After a nighttime lull, Heller cautioned, the smog would likely spike again in the morning.

The unusually heavy smog was evident to the crowd of one million onlookers at the Macy's Thanksgiving Day Parade. Tabloids and newspapers that ordinarily ran front-page stories about the parade instead carried stories about the smog. Health officials cautioned those with chronic lung diseases to stay indoors and advised patients that symptoms of pollution-related illness usually lagged 24 hours after exposure.

That day, the city closed all 11 of its municipal garbage incinerators. Energy companies Consolidated Edison (called Con Ed for short) and Long Island Lighting Company were asked to burn natural gas rather than fuel oil to minimize the release of sulfur dioxide; both companies voluntarily cut back emissions, with Con Ed reducing its emissions by 50 percent. The city told 18 inspectors "to forget their turkey dinners and start looking for dirty air," and they issued an "unusually high" number of citations for emissions violations, including two for Con Ed plants. Representative William Fitts Ryan of Manhattan sent a telegram to Secretary of Health, Education and Welfare John W. Gardner to request an emergency meeting with New York Governor Nelson Rockefeller, New Jersey Governor Richard J. Hughes, and other regional leaders.

=== November 25: first-stage alert declared ===
New Yorkers went to work [the morning of November 25] in acrid, sour-tasting air that was almost dead calm.

Many had headaches that were not the product, they thought, of holiday over-eating. Their throats scratched. But no deaths were attributed to the smog ...

— Homer Bigart, "Smog Emergency Called for City," front-page article for the November 26, 1966 edition of The New York Times

By Friday November 25, a first-stage alert for the New York metropolitan area, including parts of New Jersey and Connecticut, was declared through newspaper, radio, and television announcements. Governors Rockefeller and Heller attended a press conference with Deputy Mayor Robert Price standing in for Mayor Lindsay, who was on vacation in Bermuda. (Note: Mayor Lindsay returned from his four-day vacation on the evening of November 27. When asked for comment about the smog he had missed, Lindsay replied "I thought I took all the bad weather with me to Bermuda. It rained there more than half the time.") The announcement "was believed to be the first appeal ever made to New York's citizens in connection with a smog problem". Conrad Simon, who acted as a liaison between the scientific and political communities during the crisis, later said "We came close to closing the city down."

Pollution was not as high in New Jersey or Connecticut as in New York, but it was still significant. New Jersey reported what was then its worst-ever smog. Elizabeth, New Jersey had smog at half the levels of New York City. A Connecticut health official reported air pollution four times higher than average, but the impact in Greenwich, Connecticut was considered minimal. The nearby New York counties of Nassau, Suffolk, and Westchester reported very little smog. Although not part of the area covered by the alert, unusually high smog was reported as far as Philadelphia, Pennsylvania and Boston, Massachusetts, (Note: Another smog-related story was reported in New Bedford, Massachusetts. Visibility there reportedly became so bad that two burglaries, one at a jewelry store and another at a liquor store, were said to have exploited the thick smog throughout the city as cover. After the burglaries, police officers patrolled businesses door-to-door that day.) whose mayor issued a similar health warning.

The alert was declared upon the advice of the Interstate Sanitation Commission. Members of the commission had been monitoring the smog situation in shifts for three days, nonstop. Thomas R. Glenn Jr., the commission's director and chief engineer, recommended the alert at 11:25 a.m. after seeing instruments in New York and New Jersey that showed carbon monoxide greater than 10 ppm (parts-per-million) and smoke greater than 7.5 ppm, both for more than four consecutive hours.

In New York, the city asked commuters to avoid driving unless necessary, and apartment buildings to stop incinerating their residents' garbage and turn heating down to 60 °F (15 °C). New Jersey and Connecticut asked their residents not to travel, and to use less power and heat. Although it was a workday, traffic was light in New York City. A check on 303 buildings of the New York City Housing Authority later found near-total cooperation with the city's requests. Private residences were believed to have had a high rate of voluntary cooperation with the city's plea to cut energy consumption.

The weather forecast called for the heat inversion to end that day, followed by a cold wind that would disperse the smog. Nevertheless, Heller said that if the wind did not come, a first-stage alert would likely remain in effect and it might become necessary to declare a second-stage alert if conditions worsened.

=== November 26: cold front arrives ===
External audio
- "Commissioner Heller Announces Lifting of Air-pollution Emergency" (November 26, 1966) — press conference with Commissioner Heller announcing the end of the alert. From the WNYC archives.

Rain came in the night. The cold front that would blow away the smog was forecasted to arrive between 5 a.m. and 9 a.m. Shortly after 9 a.m. the wind arrived, moving mostly from the northeast between 6–10 miles per hour and bringing cooler temperatures in the 50s °F (10–15 °C). Glenn at the Interstate Sanitation Commission sent a message advising the alert to end at 9:40 a.m., based on weather and air readings. Shortly after noon, Governor Rockefeller declared the end of the alert; New Jersey and Connecticut also ended their alerts that day.

Health effects from the smog were downplayed in most early reports. Some hospitals reported increased admissions of patients with asthma. An official at the city Department of Health noted that some hospitals were receiving fewer asthma patients, and attributed the reported increases to ordinary random fluctuations. The official told The New York Times that "[i]n not one [hospital] is a pattern emerging which would suggest we are dealing with an important health hazard as of this moment." By this time, the inability to incinerate garbage had generated a large amount of excess waste. Hundreds of sanitation workers worked overtime to transport garbage to landfills in the Bronx, Brooklyn, and Staten Island, with the bulk going to Fresh Kills in Staten Island.

== Impact ==
The atmosphere of New York was bombarded with more man-made contaminants than any other big city in the country—almost two pounds of soot and noxious gases for every man, woman, and child. So great is the burden of pollution that were it not for the prevailing wind, New York City might have gone the way of Sodom and Gomorrah.

— John C. Esposito, Vanishing Air (1970)

=== Initial estimates of health effects and casualties ===
It was not initially clear to the medical community how many casualties and illnesses had been caused by the smog—or indeed, whether the smog had caused any casualties at all. The population of the area affected by the smog has been estimated at 16 million. A November 26 story by Jane Brody in the New York Times cautioned that it would likely take "a month or more" before investigators had enough data to assess whether the smog had caused any deaths. Three days later, after studying admissions to municipal hospitals for cardiac and respiratory complications, the city commissioner of hospitals Joseph V. Terenzio told the press "I can report almost with certainty that there was no detectable immediate effect on morbidity and mortality because of the smog. ... It now seems unlikely that final statistical analysis will reveal any significant impact on the health of New York City's population." Early reports of injuries focused not on respiratory damage, but on car or boating accidents caused by poor visibility.

Nonfatal health effects were difficult to measure in the smog's immediate aftermath. Some of the health effects were themselves delayed; for example, most of the serious effects on the elderly population would only manifest days after initial exposure. A study on the smog's nonfatal health effects was published in December 1966. The study, conducted by a nonprofit health research group, found that 10 percent of the city's population had developed some negative health effects from the smog, including symptoms like stinging eyes, coughing, wheezing, the coughing-up of phlegm, or difficulty breathing. The director of the research group said anything serious enough to adversely affect as much as 10 percent of the population, like the smog had, indicated the existence of a serious public health problem.

=== Subsequent estimates of casualties ===
The earliest report of casualties came in a special message by President Lyndon B. Johnson sent to Congress on January 30, 1967. In the message, the president said 80 people had died in the smog. Johnson did not cite a source for that claimed estimate of deaths, and there is no known source concluding that 80 people died other than those citing Johnson. (Note: Johnson's source for a death toll of 80 is not clear, but the figure is sometimes repeated (see, for example, its use in Bernstein 1996, p. 294, a biography of Johnson), even after the publication of more-reliable scientific medical papers on the subject. Legal scholar Arnold W. Reitze, who used Greenburg's figure in a scholarly law review article, noticed the discrepancy among sources. Reitze noted "fatality figures concerning episodes are based on statistical techniques and vary among data reporting sources.")

Two major medical studies have analyzed the extent of casualties from the smog. Leonard Greenburg—the same medical researcher who had previously published findings on the death count of the 1953 and 1963 smogs—published a paper in October 1967 showing that the previous year's smog had likely killed 168 people. Greenburg showed that there were 24 deaths in excess of how many would normally be expected at that time of year every day, over a period of seven days—using a period four days longer than the smog itself had lasted because of the delay between smog exposure and resultant health effects. Greenburg said that his analysis could not account for damage during the smog that would remain latent and continue to cause disease and death for years. The results of Greenburg's paper were reported by The New York Times.

The smog was compared to the 1948 smog in Donora, Pennsylvania, and the 1952 Great Smog of London, both of which lasted five days. The London smog's death toll of 4,000 was far higher than Donora's, but the smog in Donora was far more severe; at the time of its smog, Donora was a small industrial town with a population of only 13,000 and its population was proportionally hit much harder than London's, with 20 deaths and smog-related illnesses among 43 percent of the population. Pollution experts estimated that if a smog event as powerful as Donora's had occurred in the much more populous New York City, the death toll could have been as high as 11,000 with four million ill.

=== Urban life and smog ===
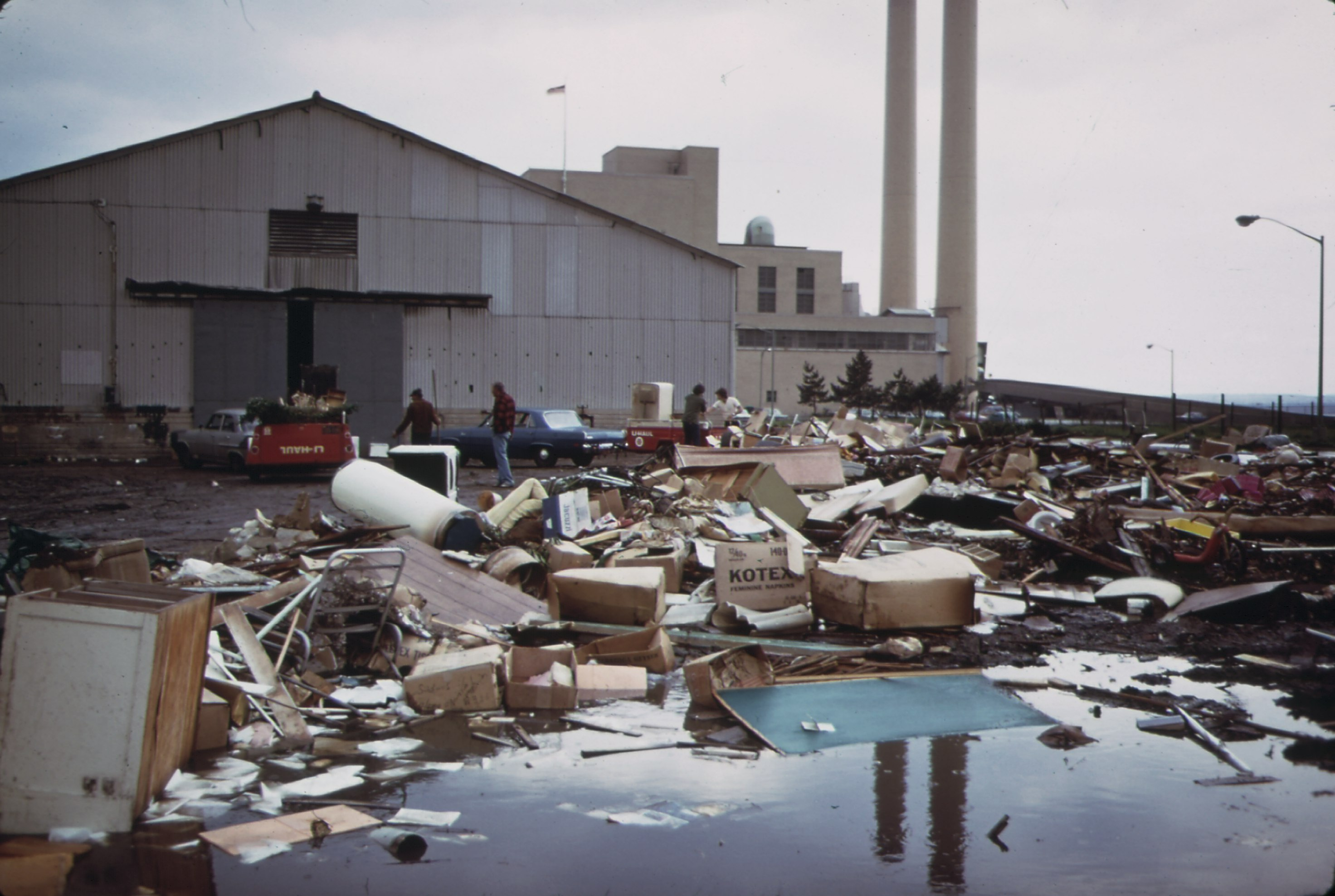
The incinerator plant at Gravesend Bay in Brooklyn, 1973. The 1966 smog demonstrated the interconnected nature of seemingly disparate problems of urban life, such as waste management and pollution.

The smog brought into focus the interrelation of environmental problems and other, complex facets of urban life. By chance, several conditions happened to prevent the smog from reaching its fullest potential strength. Since the event began over the long Thanksgiving weekend, not the workweek, many factories were closed and far fewer commuters were in traffic than normally would be. The unseasonably warm weather reduced the need for central heating. On November 25, the high of 64 °F (18 °C) broke the previous record high for that date, leading the reporter Homer Bigart to describe the apartment-heating restrictions as "no problem" for residents. These mitigating factors meant that pollutant levels—as well as the ensuing death toll and other adverse health effects—were likely lower than they could have been in less favorable conditions.

Attempts by city government to react to the smog had unintended negative side effects. As Mayor Lindsay reflected in his 1969 book The City, "[e]very time you shut down an incinerator, you increase the amount of garbage on city streets." Efforts to address a given environmental problem can cause undesired side effects, sometimes unforeseeable, and often related to a city's limited resources.

Environmental harms in general are linked to urban decay and social inequality. After the 1966 smog, the task of reducing air pollution became an essential part of the municipal government's goal to make "the city attractive again to the middle class and acceptable to all its residents." Such harms—but especially those that generate obvious and unpleasant effects, as smog does—were among many factors that motivated and exacerbated white flight (Note: The term "white flight" refers to the historical mass migration of white, typically middle-class Americans from urban areas into their surrounding suburbs, especially in the mid-to-late 20th century.) from American cities, including New York City, in the mid-20th century. The mass migration of affluent residents—motivated at least in part by environmental harms like chronic smog—drained the city's tax base and resulted in an economic loss of human capital. Residents who remained in the city often lacked the financial resources that would have enabled them to move somewhere else, even if they had wanted to flee the unpleasant environment and health hazards caused by pollution. The burdens of that pollution—including the direct effects of pollution itself, indirect effects (such as uncollected garbage in the streets), and other problems stemming from lack of municipal resources after white flight—became "emblems of larger governmental neglect and social inequality" to those residents.

== Political reaction ==
=== National attention ===
The smog is commonly cited as one of the most-visible and most-discussed environmental disasters of the 1960s in the United States, alongside the 1969 Santa Barbara oil spill and the 1969 Cuyahoga River fire. National public awareness of the smog and its health effects spurred the nascent environmental movement in the United States and galvanized support for legislation to regulate air pollution. Vernon McKenzie, chief of the air pollution division of the federal Public Health Service, called the smog "a warning of what can happen—and will happen—with increasing frequency and in wider areas unless something is done to prevent it." In the 1968 book Killer Smog, William Wise warned that the 1966 smog and the 1952 London smog represented a vulnerability to air pollution disasters among American cities:

Perhaps, as in Great Britain, change will begin to come only after a large-scale tragedy. The conditions are favorable for one in any of a dozen of the nation's most populous cities. A mass of still air drifting slowly eastward, an intense thermal inversion, and then five, six, seven days of increasingly poisonous smog. The air will look bronze, almost copper-colored, as it did during New York's 1966 Thanksgiving smog. ... From every appearance, a similar tragedy is now being prepared in America—and there is very little time left in which to prevent it.

At the time of the smog event, only half of the urban population of the United States lived with local protections on air quality; the smog event catalyzed the call for federal regulation on the issue. Spencer R. Weart of the American Institute of Physics said the American public "did not take the problem [of air pollution] seriously" until the 1966 smog. According to Weart, an important factor driving awareness of the smog was its location, as events in New York "always had a disproportionate influence on the media headquartered there."

=== Municipal response ===
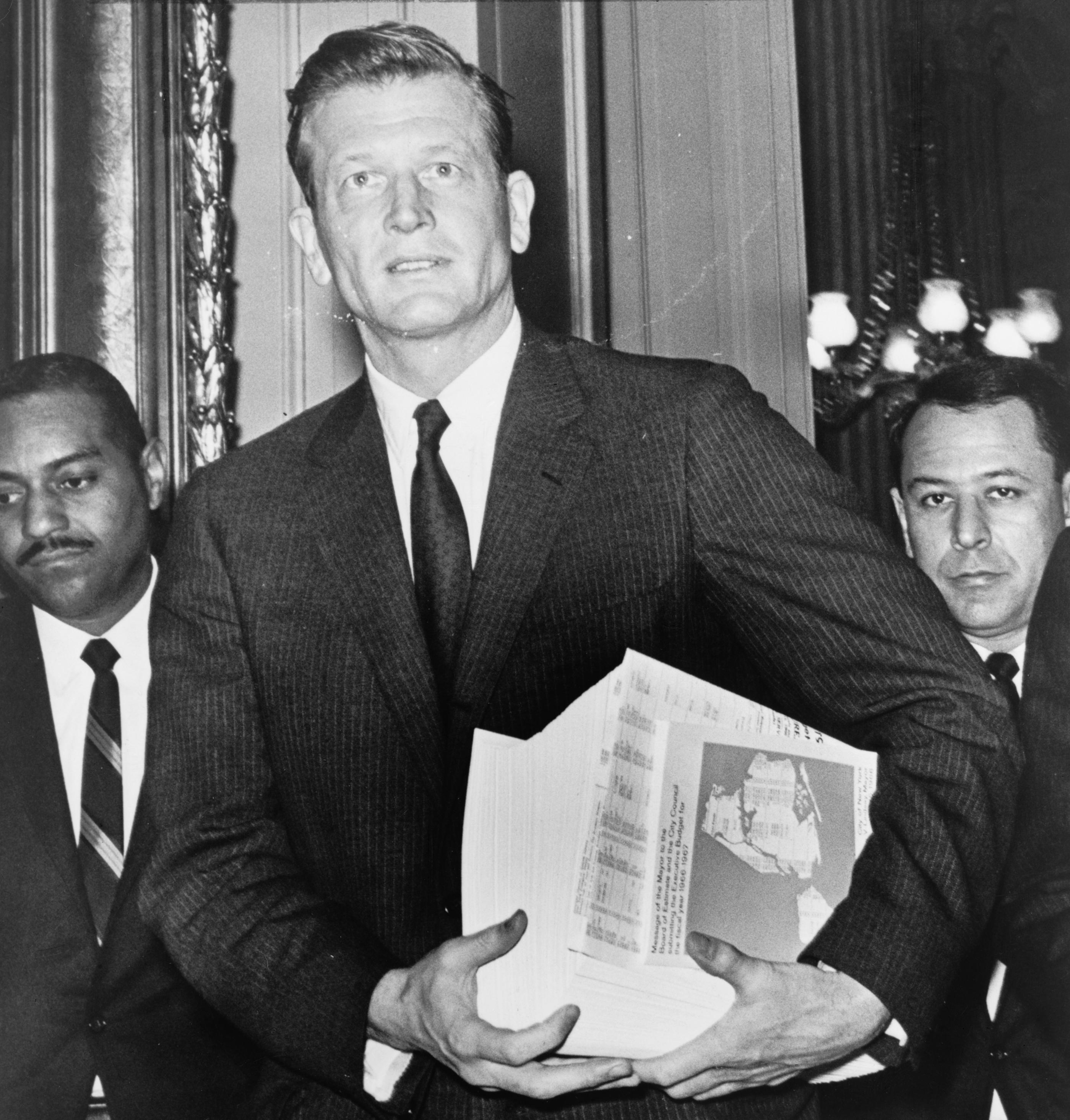
John Lindsay (pictured in April 1966) was the mayor of New York City during the 1966 smog.

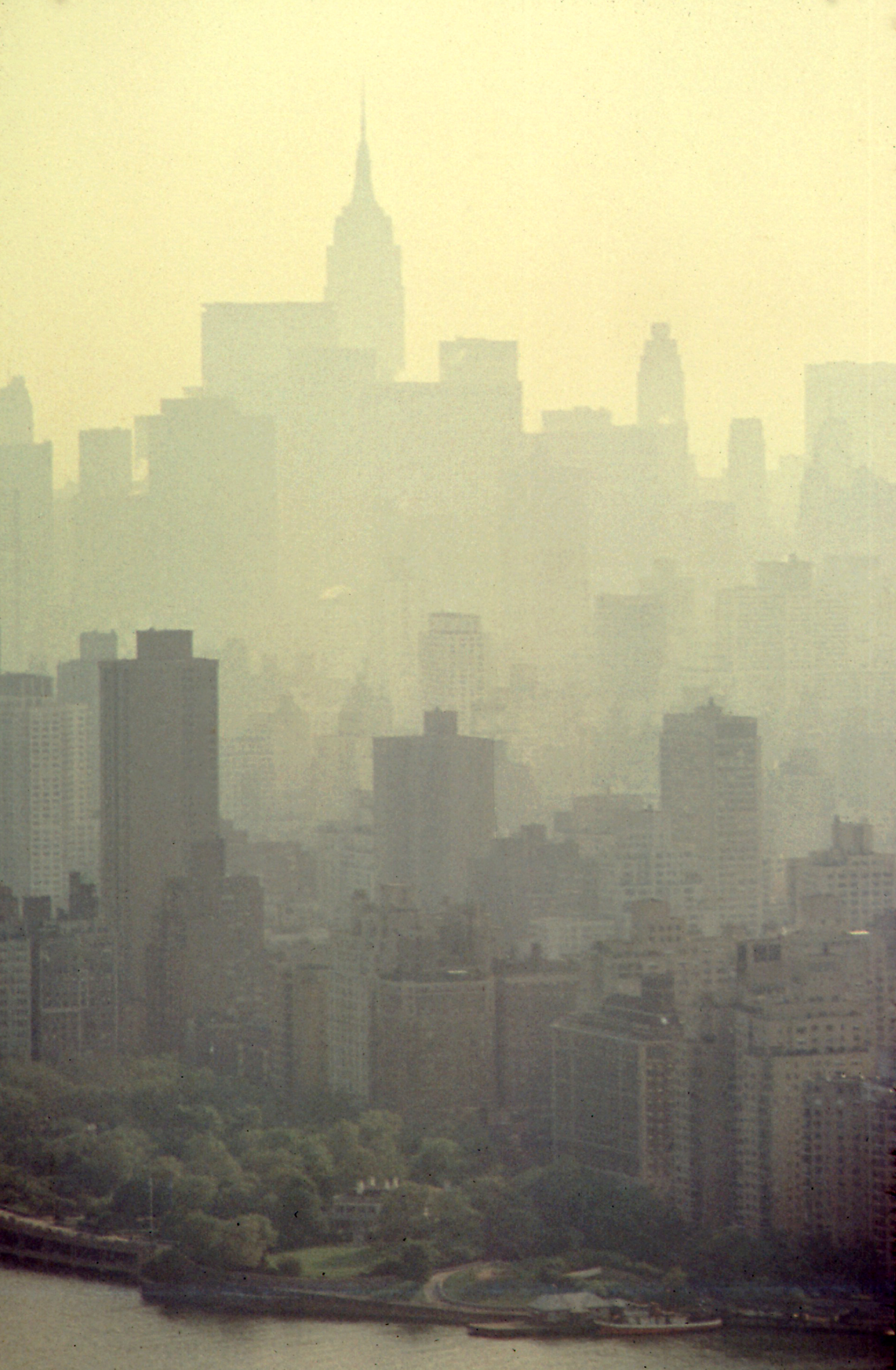
Smog in May 1973. By 1972 New York City had cut levels of sulfur dioxide and particulates by half from their peak.

Before the 1966 smog, the city government had been slow to act to regulate air pollution. Despite general awareness of the health and environmental impacts of smog, other problems took priority: as The New York Times reported, issues like "housing, crime, education and keeping the city 'cool' were at the forefront of city government concerns." But the 1966 smog impelled a swift response by the city government, who now felt pressure to respond "in the aftermath of disaster." Lindsay, then a liberal Rockefeller Republican, had run as a supporter of stronger air pollution control in his 1965 mayoral campaign, and the 1966 smog reinforced Lindsay's position on the issue.

City Council member Robert A. Low, a Manhattan Democrat and chairman of the city subcommittee on air pollution, criticized Lindsay for failing to enforce an air-pollution bill that had been passed in May. The bill, authored by Low, would update city incinerators and require apartment buildings to replace their incinerators with other garbage disposal methods. Low accused Lindsay's administration of "dragging its feet" on the problem of air pollution, which Lindsay called a "political attack."

The mayor's office prepared a report in the aftermath of the smog, singling out the coal-burning Consolidated Edison company, city buses, and apartment building incinerators as significant contributors to air pollution. The report noted that the change in weather that dispersed the smog "spared the city an unspeakable tragedy," and that if New York City had stagnant smog at the high levels commonly found in Los Angeles, "everyone in the city would have long since perished from the poisons in the air." Consolidated Edison began using a fuel with lower sulfur content, and by June 1969 the city had reduced the level of sulfur dioxide in the air by 28 percent.

In December 1966, the New York City Administrative Code section on pollutant levels in the air was strengthened by a bill that was later described as the "toughest air pollution control bill in the country" at that time. Lindsay announced a plan to install 36 new stations for the Department of Air Pollution Control to measure air pollution levels throughout the city—an upgrade from the sole station in the Harlem Courthouse building. The stations would send data to a central computer using telemetry to create a profile of the city atmosphere. Five of those stations would also send data to the Interstate Sanitation Commission. The city purchased a computer system and equipment from the Packard Bell Corporation for $181,000 ($1.3 million in 2024 dollars).

In November 1968, the city opened 38 monitoring stations, 10 outfitted with computer equipment. The 10 computerized stations were designed to send data every hour to the central computer, while the other 28 operated manually as backup. The old index system used during the 1966 smog, which produced a single number from multiple measurements, was abandoned as simplistic and unhelpful. The new index system was similar in that it used weather forecasts and measurements of pollutants in the air and had three progressive stages of severity ("alert," "warning," and "emergency") requiring stronger actions by city, industry, and citizens.

The city's actions mitigated air pollution and reduced the likelihood of a major smog event on the same scale. In contrast to dire warnings from the mayor's air-pollution task force in its May 1966 report, a city official said in 1969 "[w]e probably have the possibility of a health catastrophe under control now." The city declared minor smog alerts in 1967 and 1970; conversely, a four-day inversion similar to the Thanksgiving weather of 1966 occurred in September 1969, but it passed without incident—neither smog nor deaths resulted. Norman Cousins, chairman of the mayor's task force, credited the regulations enacted since the 1966 smog for the prevention of a comparable September 1969 event. Cousins wrote in a message to Lindsay:

New York City's air is cleaner and more breathable today than it was in 1966. ... It is important to ask what would have happened on those days [in September 1969] if the pollution levels had continued to worsen at the same rate of deterioration that occurred from 1964 to 1966. The answer is that there could have been a substantial number of casualties. The fact that an episode did not occur attests to the capability of the City's programs to protect its air resources.

After the passage of strict new state and federal air regulations, the city passed its updated Air Pollution Control Code in 1971, designed in part to address concerns that nitrogen oxides and unburned hydrocarbons had been left insufficiently controlled by the previous changes. By 1972, New York City had cut levels of sulfur dioxide and particulates by half from their peak. According to an article published by the EPA Journal in 1986, those improvements at the city level were "the legacy of concern that emerged after the 1966 Thanksgiving Day smog disaster."

=== States' responses ===
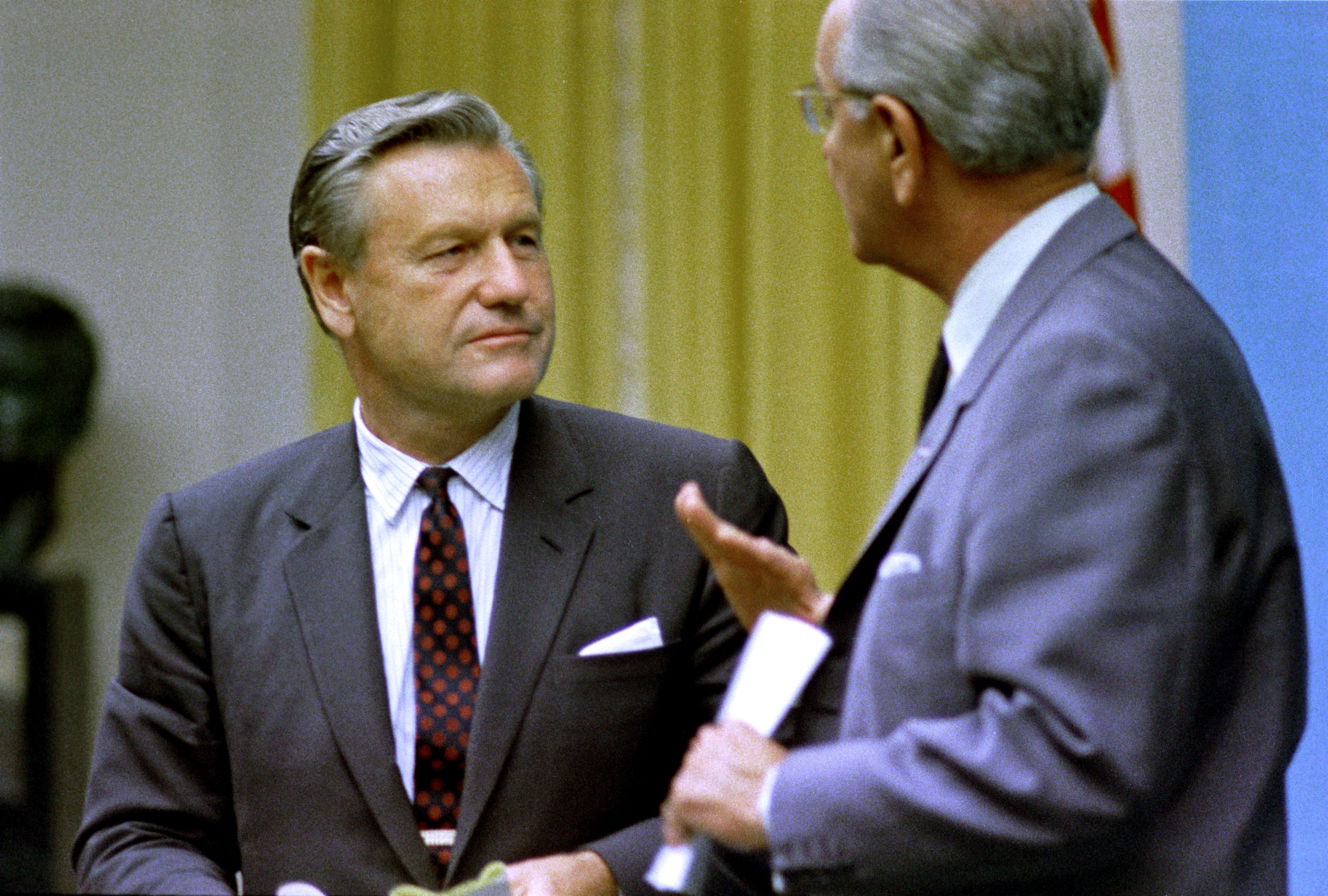
Following the 1966 smog, air-pollution control became a major policy objective of both Nelson Rockefeller (left), the Republican Governor of New York, and Lyndon B. Johnson, the Democratic president.

Before 1966, air-pollution control had largely been the responsibility of states and political subdivisions of states like counties and municipalities (cities and towns). The federal government played little role in air-pollution control, and to the extent that it did, its actions supported the efforts of states and local governments. For example, federal law provided resources like research, training, grants to improve state and local programs, and a conference procedure to convene agencies and polluters under the guidance of the Department of Health, Education and Welfare. Direct regulations—such as, for example, setting emissions standards—were left to states.

The governors of New York (Rockefeller), New Jersey (Hughes), Delaware (Charles L. Terry Jr.), and Pennsylvania (Raymond P. Shafer) met in December 1966 to address air pollution in their region. Each governor pledged to enforce their state's pollution abatement laws and to prevent their own state from becoming a "pollution haven" with lax regulations to attract industry.

At the same meeting, the governors also discussed the possibility of new tax incentives to motivate industry to reduce pollution and the creation of a new interstate compact (Note: In American law, an interstate compact is an agreement between two or more states, often to create a new regional governmental agency. Article I, Section 10 of the Constitution requires the approval of Congress before any interstate compact can take effect.) to set industry standards, which would require adoption by all member states and approval by Congress. Those four states were already members of the Delaware River Basin Commission (DRBC), an interstate agency that controls water pollution in the Delaware River. The proposed air-pollution compact was modeled after the DRBC and would function similarly, setting minimum air standards across states and enabling enforcement actions against polluters. New York, New Jersey, and Connecticut adopted the proposed Mid-Atlantic States Air Pollution Control Compact with the possibility for Delaware and Pennsylvania to join in the future. Its approval by Congress became a policy goal of Rockefeller's failed primary bid for the 1968 Republican presidential nomination. The compact was never approved by Congress and thus never took effect.

After the 1966 smog, "the consequences of state inaction were apparent to the naked eye," public outcry intensified, and the demand for federal intervention increased. New Jersey passed several new air-pollution laws in 1967. Nevertheless, traffic and drifting polluted air from New Jersey remained a major contributor to New York City's pollution problem. Edward Teller—the physicist known for his role in developing the hydrogen bomb and an advisor to Mayor Lindsay on pollution and energy issues—advocated for New York state to adopt stricter sulfur fuel standards than the city. A leader of the advocacy group Citizens for Cleaner Air criticized the local and state governments at a state public hearing, calling the city's enforcement "in a state of collapse" and, saying the city acting alone "cannot or will not enforce any standard or rule," demanded that the state government increase its role.

Perhaps the most notable critic of New York's inaction was Robert F. Kennedy. On a 1967 tour of pollution sources, Kennedy—then a New York Senator and soon to embark on his 1968 presidential campaign—criticized the city, the states of New York and New Jersey, industry, and the federal government for their failures to adequately address the problem. Kennedy warned, "[w]e are just as close to an air-pollution disaster as we were last Thanksgiving." In Kennedy's view, the solution would have to come from the federal government, as state and local agencies lacked the ability or oversight for the task.

=== Federal response ===
Air pollution control, already a priority of President Lyndon B. Johnson's administration, (Note: Johnson signed legislation in 1965 to establish new standards for automobiles by 1967. In May 1966, Johnson signed an executive order that directed the heads of all federal agencies to plan the installation of air pollution controls at federal facilities. Joe Califano, Johnson's Secretary of Health, Education, and Welfare, organized a task force in 1966 to prepare a report for the 90th Congress on issues of environmental concern, primarily air pollution. The task force's report was published November 21, 1963—just days before the New York City smog.) became a greater concern after the smog. By early 1967, his statements on air pollution became more rhetorically urgent. In January 1967, Johnson sent a message to Congress entitled "Protecting Our National Heritage," the first section of which was entitled "The Pollution of Our Air" and focused on the problems posed by air pollution. The message was prompted by wide public discussion of the problem following the 1966 smog. Johnson cited the experiences of specific American cities and towns in the message, and highlighted the 1966 smog at length:

Two months ago, a mass of heavily polluted air—filled with poisons from incinerators, industrial furnaces, power plants, car, bus and truck engines—settled down upon the sixteen million people of Greater New York.

For four days, anyone going out on the streets inhaled chemical compounds that threatened his health. Those who remained inside had little protection from the noxious gases that passed freely through cooling and heating systems.

An estimated 80 persons died. Thousands of men and women already suffering from respiratory diseases lived out the four days in fear and pain.

Finally, the winds came, freeing the mass of air from the weather-trap that had held it so dangerously. The immediate crisis was ended. New Yorkers began to breathe "ordinary" air again.

"Ordinary" air in New York, as in most large cities, is filled with tons of pollutants: carbon monoxide from gasoline, diesel and jet engines, sulfur oxides from factories, apartment houses, and power plants; nitrogen oxides, hydrocarbons and a broad variety of other compounds. These poisons are not so dramatically dangerous most days of the year, as they were last Thanksgiving in New York. But steadily, insidiously, they damage virtually everything that exists.

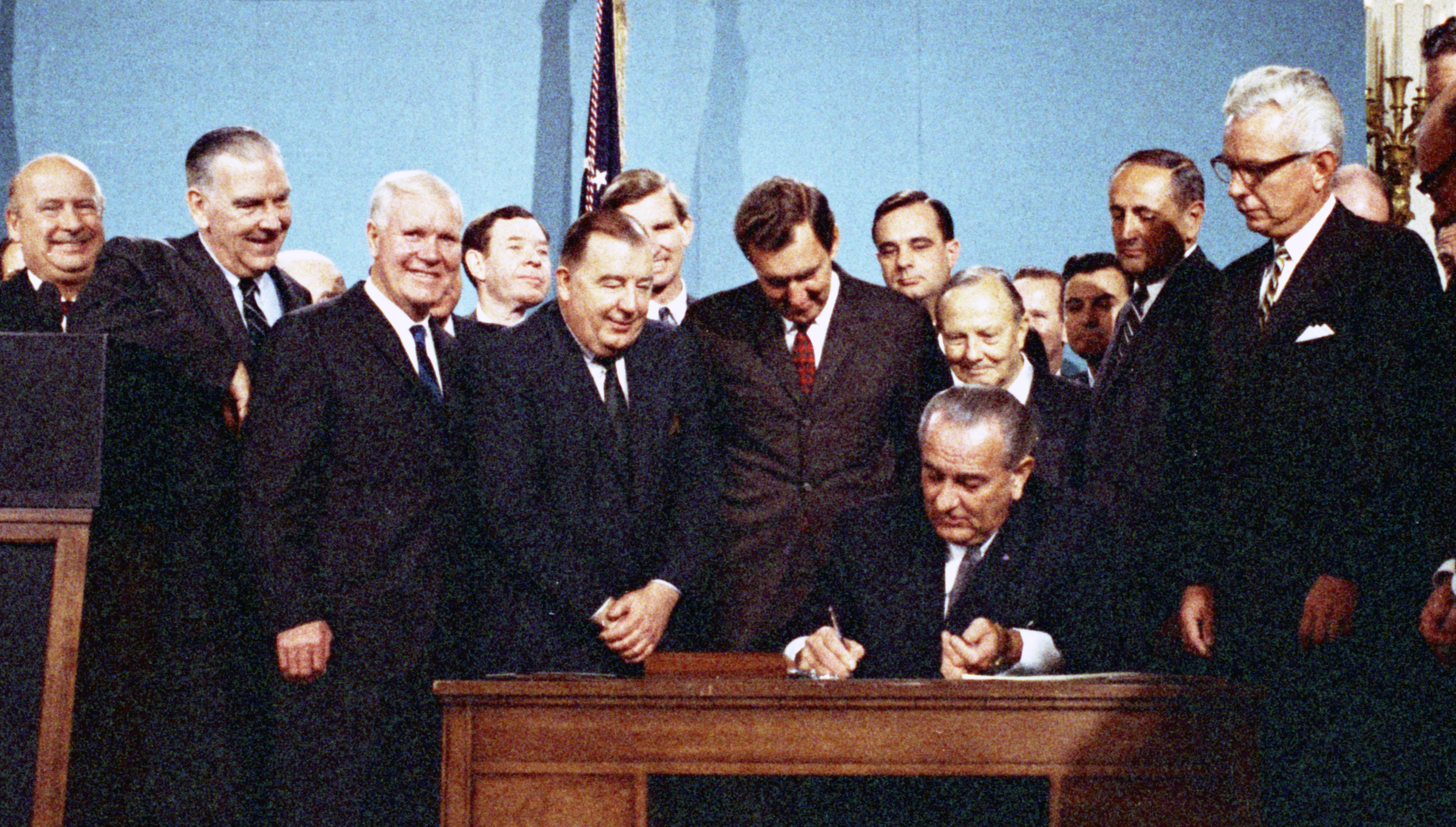
President Johnson signing the Air Quality Act of 1967. The law, a series of amendments to the 1963 Clean Air Act, was enacted in response to the 1966 smog.

Johnson called for a bill regulating toxins in the air and increasing funding for pollution programs. Edmund Muskie, a Senator from Maine and political environmentalist, praised Johnson's words, pledged to hold hearings on the proposals, and would soon sponsor the Johnson administration's bill, which became the Air Quality Act. Muskie also co-sponsored bills in 1967 for research on non-polluting automobiles using either electric or fuel cell technology. While discussing the research bills on the Senate floor, Muskie said "the serious air pollution situation in New York City [in November 1966] dramatically illustrated what our cities may be facing in the future if an alternative to the [internal] combustion engine is not developed."

Congressional interest and public pressure for greater air pollution regulation had existed since the signing of the 1963 Clean Air Act, the first federal legislation on the issue, but further action had been opposed by members of Congress who believed responsibility for air regulation properly lay with the states, not the federal government. Partly in response to the added public pressure spurred by the smog event, Congress passed and Johnson signed the 1967 Air Quality Act, which amended the 1963 Clean Air Act to provide for study of air quality and control methods.

The Air Quality Act was a significant advancement in the realm of air-pollution regulation, but one that was ultimately ineffective. In Train v. Natural Resources Defense Council, Inc., a 1975 decision by the Supreme Court of the United States, Justice William Rehnquist summarized the law's effect as follows:

The focus shifted somewhat in the Air Quality Act of 1967, 81 Stat. 485. It reiterated the premise of the earlier Clean Air Act 'that the prevention and control of air pollution at its source is the primary responsibility of States and local governments.' Its provisions, however, increased the federal role in the prevention of air pollution, by according federal authorities certain powers of supervision and enforcement. But the States generally retained wide latitude to determine both the air quality standards which they would meet and the period of time in which they would do so. The response of the State to these manifestations of increasing congressional concern with air pollution was disappointing. Even by 1970, state planning and implementation under the Air Quality Act of 1967 had made little progress.

Among contemporaneous critics, John C. Esposito—an environmentalist and affiliate of Ralph Nader—wrote the 1970 book Vanishing Air to accuse Muskie of watering down the bill and adding needless complications to satisfy industry. A 2011 encyclopedia of environmental law article judged that the act "was a failure but it was the first step in federal air pollution control." Calls for greater air pollution regulation in this era culminated with the passage under President Richard Nixon of the 1970 Clean Air Act, which supplanted the Air Quality Act and has been described as the most significant environmental legislation in American history. The 1970 Clean Air Act significantly increased the role of the federal government and, for the first time, imposed air quality requirements on states.

== The 1966 smog in cultural memory ==
The most widely recognized legacy of the 1966 smog was the political reaction to it, which galvanized the nascent environmental movement in the United States and prompted demand for sweeping air-pollution control laws. The smog has been remembered for various purposes by scientists, historians, journalists, writers, artists, activists, and political commentators.

=== Compared to the September 11 attacks ===
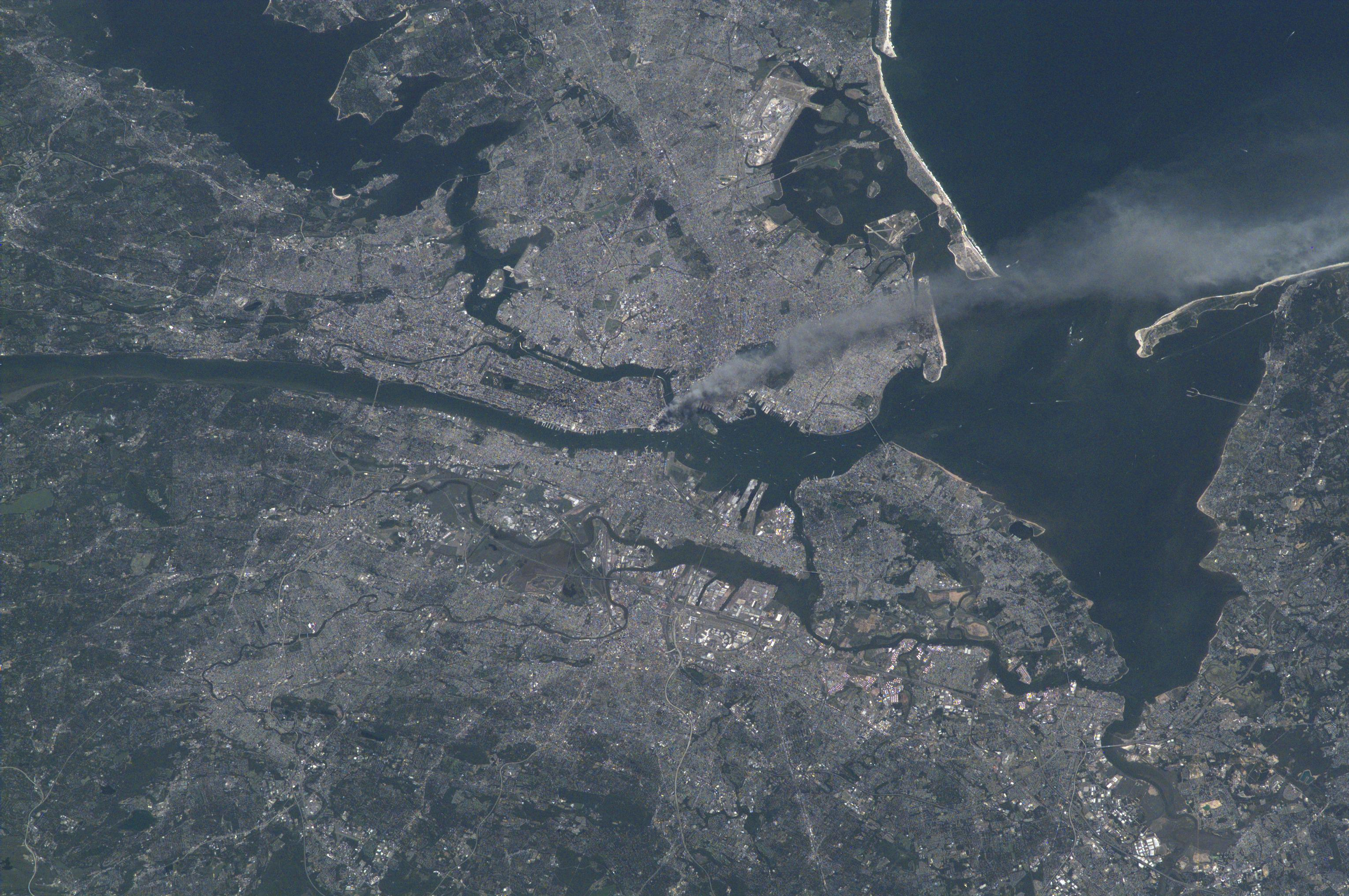
A plume of smoke rising from lower Manhattan after the September 11 attacks, seen from space. Cumulative air pollution events like the 1966 smog contrast with the sudden pollution that resulted from the September 11 attacks.

The full range of negative health effects arising from the September 11 attacks came to light in the years following the attacks. The 1966 smog serves, along with the earlier major New York City smog events in 1953 and 1963, as a precedent used for comparison with the air effects caused by the collapse of the World Trade Center. The 1966 smog and other historical smog events differ from the September 11 pollution in significant ways that limit their usefulness as a point of comparison. Prior New York City smog events were chronic, cumulative, and caused by thousands of small sources, while the air impact of the September was sudden, intense, and the result of a single culpable source. The absence of prior events similar to the September 11 attacks left "a hole in the medical library," and presented medical experts with a challenge in the absence of "hard knowledge about the health consequences of intense brief pollution."

=== Compared to 21st-century smog in China ===
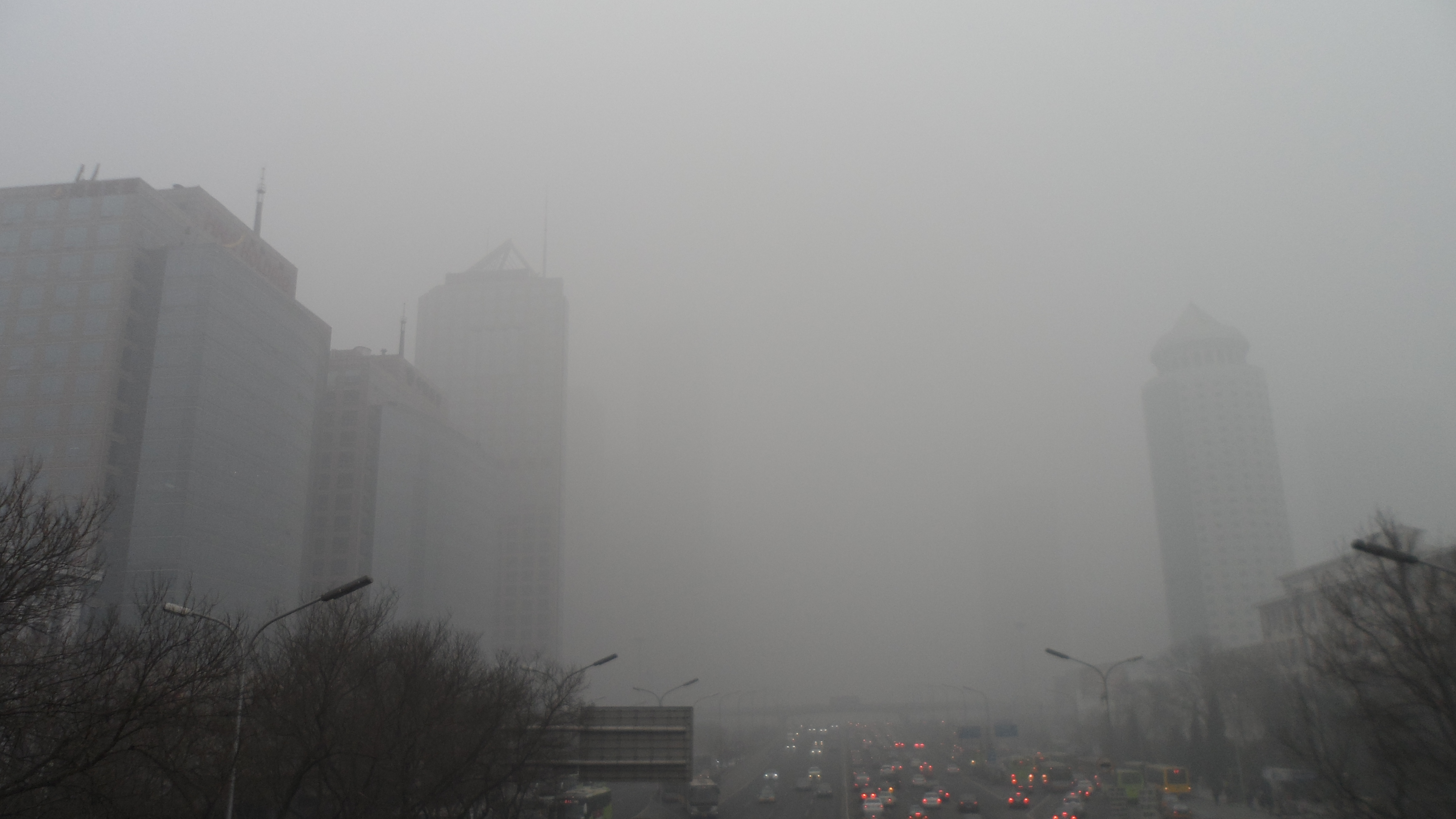
The 1966 New York smog served as a historical precedent for air pollution in China in the 2010s (pictured is Beijing in early 2013).

Other major air pollution, particularly in China, has been compared to the 1966 smog. Elizabeth M. Lynch, a New York–based legal scholar, said that images of visible air pollution in Beijing from 2012 were "gross" but not "that much different from pictures of New York City in the 1950s and 1960s", specifically referring to the 1952, 1962, and 1966 smog events. Lynch wrote that the Chinese government's increased transparency on the issue was an encouraging sign that pollution in China could be regulated and abated, just as it had in the United States. Similar comparisons between the 1966 smog and Chinese pollution in late 2012 appeared in Business Insider and Slate. USA Today cited the 1966 smog after China issued its first "red alert" air quality warning in December 2015; the same month, an article in The Huffington Post used the 1966 smog to argue that China could follow the United States' model to regulate pollution.

=== In pop culture ===
External videos
- "Smog Almost Killed New York City, Here's How" (March 24, 2017) — interview with photographer Arthur Tress and history of air pollution in the United States. Video by Seeker, via YouTube.

The smog event became a pop cultural referent in the 2010s. The smog figured into the plot of the 2012 Mad Men episode "Dark Shadows", set in New York City during the same Thanksgiving weekend of 1966. A reviewer in The A.V. Club interpreted the writers' use of the smog as a symbolic representation of the character Betty, who spends the episode "longing to enter [Don Draper's] apartment and tear some shit up"—"hover[ing]" and "waiting to poison it from within". The New York City-based indie pop band Vampire Weekend used a photograph of the smog over the city skyline, taken by Neal Boenzi and originally published in The New York Times, for the cover of their 2013 album Modern Vampires of the City.

=== After the election of Donald Trump ===
Following the 2016 election of Donald Trump to the presidency, his administration's environmental policy—which included steep budget cuts to the EPA and deregulation—prompted several reflections on the environmental condition of the United States before the creation of the EPA. Articles published by The New York Times, Vice Media's tech-news site Motherboard, public radio station WNYC, real-estate news site 6sqft, and the Natural Resources Defense Council (NRDC) environmental advocacy group connected Trump's declared policy agenda to a risk of returning to a more polluted environment, with each publication evoking the 1966 smog as an example of the potential dangers of defunding and deregulation. David Hawkins, an attorney for NRDC, recalled:

I was a student at Columbia Law School during the 1966 episode. It was frightening, but while that is the best-known event, heavy pollution was an everyday fact of life those days.

== See also ==
- Air pollution in the United States
- Urban heat island
- Other smog events
  - 1948 Donora smog
  - Great Smog of London
  - Pollution in China
  - Pollution in California
  - Pea soup fog
- Air quality law
  - Clean Air Act (United States)
