= Visibility =

Measure of the distance needed to visually discern an object

In meteorology, visibility is the measure of the distance at which an object or light can be clearly discerned. It depends on the transparency of the surrounding air and as such, it is unchanging no matter the ambient light level or time of day. It is reported within surface weather observations and METAR code either in meters or statute miles, depending upon the country. Visibility affects all forms of traffic: roads, railways, sailing and aviation.

The geometric range of vision is limited by the curvature of the Earth and depends on the eye level and the height of the object being viewed. In geodesy, the atmospheric refraction must be taken into account when calculating geodetic visibility.

== Meteorological visibility ==
=== Definition ===
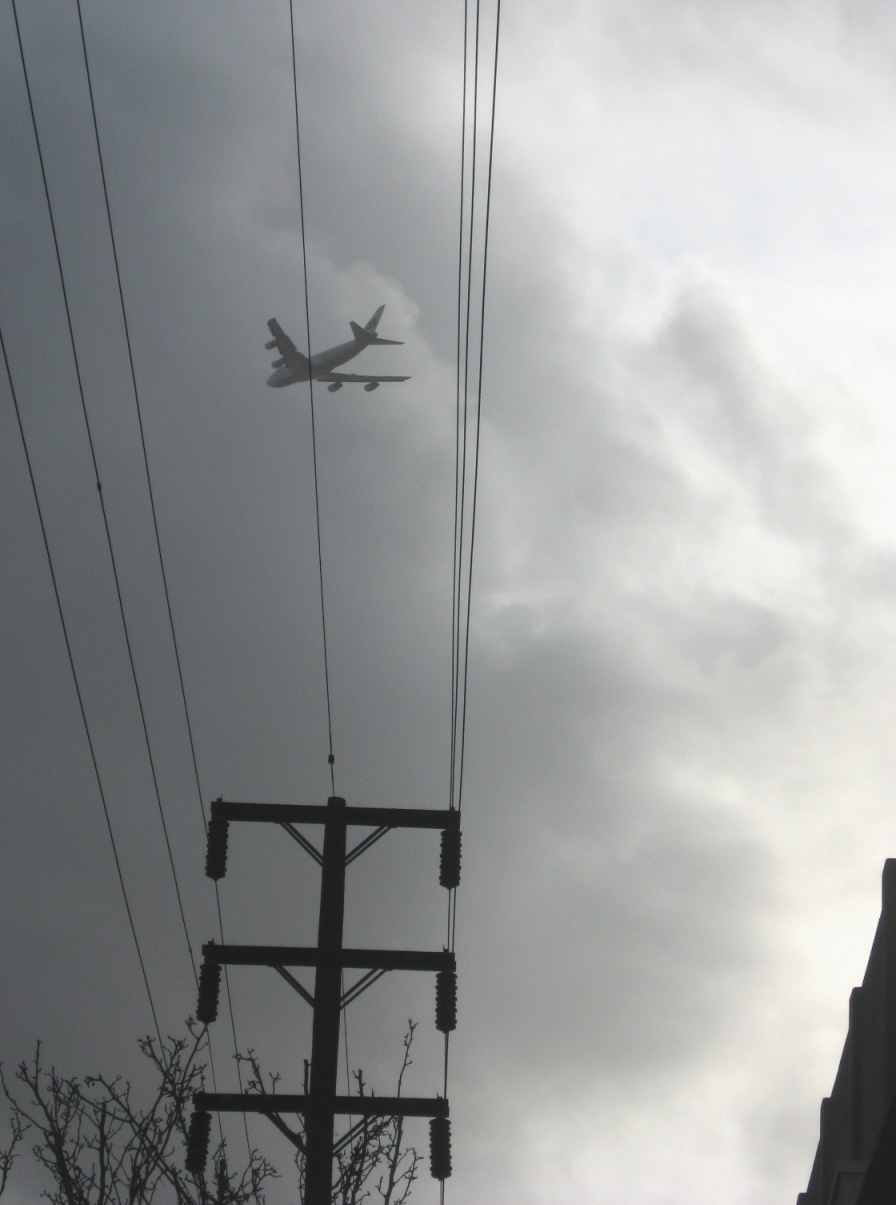
Airplane flying into clouds on descent for landing

ICAO Annex 3 Meteorological Service for International Air Navigation contains the following definitions and note:

a) the greatest distance at which a black object of suitable dimensions, situated near the ground, can be seen and recognized when observed against a bright background;
b) the greatest distance at which lights of 1,000 candelas can be seen and identified against an unlit background.
Note.— The two distances have different values in air of a given extinction coefficient, and the latter b) varies with the background illumination. The former a) is represented by the meteorological optical range (MOR).

Annex 3 also defines Runway Visual Range (RVR) as:

The range over which the pilot of an aircraft on the centre line of a runway can see the runway surface markings or the lights delineating the runway or identifying its centre line.

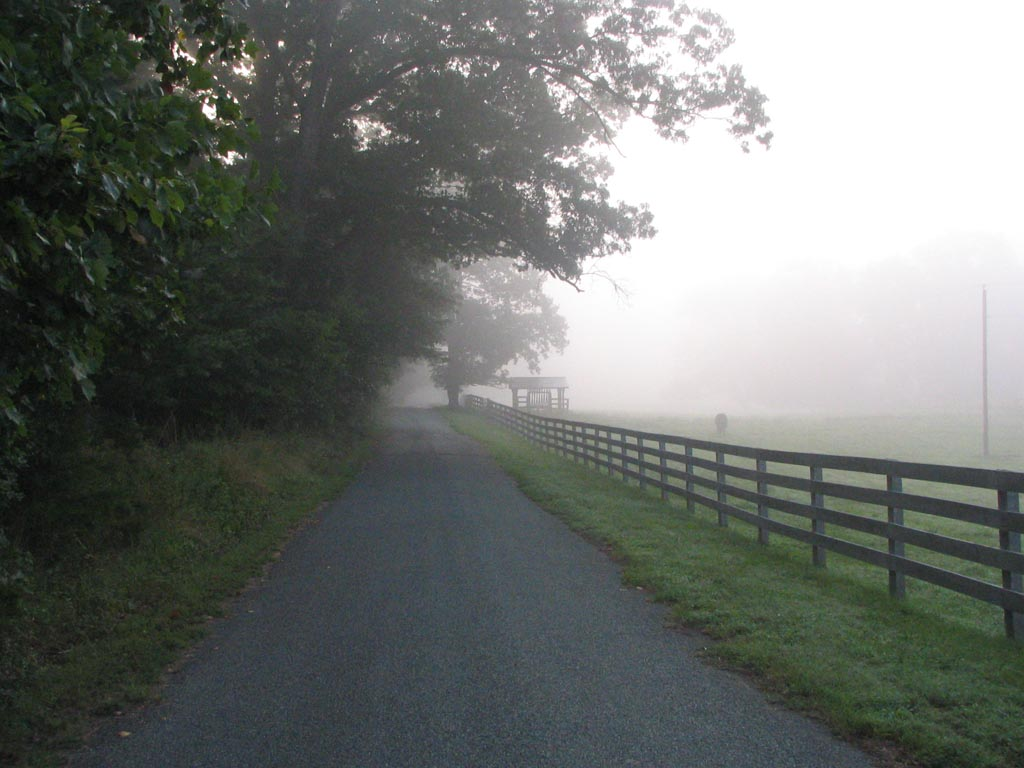
Foggy morning road

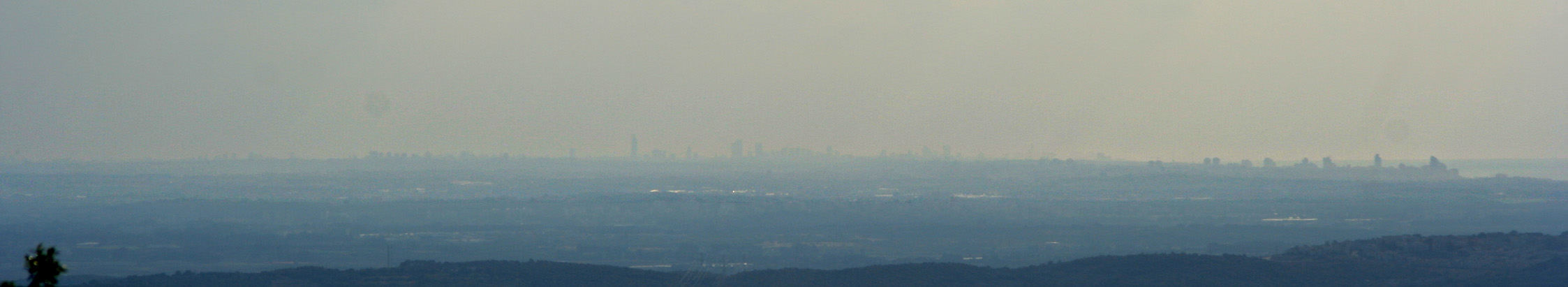
On clear days, Tel Aviv's skyline is visible from the Carmel mountains, 80 km north

In extremely clean air (e.g., in Arctic areas), the visibility can be up to 240 km (150 miles). Distant observable visibility requires large markers such as mountains or high ridges; however, visibility is often reduced somewhat by air pollution and high humidity. Various weather stations report this as haze (dry) or mist (moist). Heavy rain (such as from a thunderstorm) can impair visibility. Blizzards and ground blizzards (blowing snow) are also defined in part by low visibility. These conditions, as well as Fog and smoke, can reduce visibility to near zero, making driving extremely dangerous. The same can happen in a sandstorm or with forest fires.

=== Derivation ===
To define visibility the case of a perfectly black object being viewed against a perfectly white background is examined. The visual contrast, C_{V}(x), at a distance x from the black object is defined as the relative difference between the light intensity of the background and the object

$$C_\text{V}(x) = \frac{F_\text{B}(x)-F(x)}{F_\text{B}(x)}$$

where F_{B}(x) and F(x) are the intensities of the background and the object, respectively. Because the object is assumed to be perfectly black, it must absorb all of the light incident on it. Thus when x=0 (at the object), F(0) = 0 and C_{V}(0) = 1.

Between the object and the observer, F(x) is affected by additional light that is scattered into the observer's line of sight and the absorption of light by gases and particles. Light scattered by particles outside of a particular beam may ultimately contribute to the irradiance at the target, a phenomenon known as multiple scattering. Unlike absorbed light, scattered light is not lost from a system. Rather, it can change directions and contribute to other directions. It is only lost from the original beam traveling in one particular direction. The multiple scatterings' contribution to the irradiance at x is modified by the individual particle scattering coefficient, the number concentration of particles, and the depth of the beam. The intensity change dF is the result of these effects over a distance dx. Because dx is a measure of the amount of suspended gases and particles, the fraction of F that is diminished is assumed to be proportional to the distance, dx. The fractional reduction in F is

$$dF = -b_\text{ext} {F} dx$$

where b_{ext} is the attenuation coefficient. The scattering of background light into the observer's line of sight can increase F over the distance dx. This increase is defined as b' F_{B}(x) dx, where b' is a constant. The overall change in intensity is expressed as

$$dF(x) = \left[b' F_\text{B}(x) - b_\text{ext} F(x)\right] dx$$

Since F_{B} represents the background intensity, it is independent of x by definition. Therefore,

$$dF_\text{B}(x) = 0 = \left[b' F_\text{B}(x) - b_\text{ext} F_\text{B}(x)\right] dx$$

It is clear from this expression that b' must be equal to b_{ext}. Thus, the visual contrast, C_{V}(x), obeys the Beer–Lambert law

$$\frac{dC_\text{V}(x)}{dx} = - b_\text{ext} C_\text{V}(x)$$

which means that the contrast decreases exponentially with the distance from the object:

$$C_\text{V}(x) = \exp(- b_\text{ext} x)$$

Lab experiments have determined that contrast ratios between 0.018 and 0.03 are perceptible under typical daylight viewing conditions. Usually, a contrast ratio of 2% (C_{V} = 0.02) is used to calculate visual range. Plugging this value into the above equation and solving for x produces the following visual range expression (the Koschmieder equation):

$$x_\text{V} = \frac{3.912}{b_\text{ext}}$$

with x_{V} in units of length. At sea level, the Rayleigh atmosphere has an extinction coefficient of approximately 13.2 × 10^{−6} m^{−1} at a wavelength of 520 nm. This means that in the cleanest possible atmosphere, visibility is limited to about 296 km.

Visibility perception depends on several physical and visual factors. A realistic definition should consider the fact that the human visual system (HVS) is highly sensitive to spatial frequencies, and then to use the Fourier transform and the contrast sensitivity function of the HVS to assess visibility.

=== Fog, mist, haze, and freezing drizzle ===
The international definition of fog is a visibility of less than 1 km (3,300 ft); mist is a visibility of between 1 km (0.62 mi) and 2 km (1.2 mi) and haze from 2 km (1.2 mi) to 5 km (3.1 mi). Fog and mist are generally assumed to be composed principally of water droplets, haze and smoke can be of smaller particle size. This has implications for sensors such as thermal imagers (TI/FLIR) operating in the far-IR at wavelengths of about 10 μm, which are better able to penetrate haze and some smokes because their particle size is smaller than the wavelength; the IR radiation is therefore not significantly deflected or absorbed by the particles.

Fog occasionally occurs along with freezing drizzle and snow. These cold weather events are caused largely by low-lying stratus clouds. This usually happens when temperatures are below 0 °C (32 °F). These conditions are hazardous due to ice formation, which can be deadly because of the low visibility (i.e., less than 1,000 yards) usually accompanying these conditions. The combination of low visibility and ice formation can lead to accidents on roadways.

=== Very low visibility ===
Visibility of less than 100 metres (330 ft) is usually reported as zero. In these conditions, roads may be closed, or automatic warning lights and signs may be activated to warn drivers. These have been put in place in certain areas that are subject to repeatedly low visibility, particularly after traffic collisions or pile-ups involving multiple vehicles.

=== Low-visibility warnings ===
In addition, an advisory is often issued by a government weather agency for low visibility, such as a dense fog advisory from the U.S. National Weather Service. These generally advise motorists to avoid travel until the fog dissipates or other conditions improve. Air travel is also often delayed by low visibility, sometimes causing long delays due to approach visibility minimums and the difficulty of safely moving aircraft on the ground in low visibility.

=== Visibility and air pollution ===
Reduced visibility is often the most apparent symptom of air pollution. Visibility degradation is caused by the absorption and scattering of light by particles and gases in the atmosphere. Absorption of electromagnetic radiation by gases and particles is sometimes the cause of discolorations in the atmosphere, but usually does not contribute very significantly to visibility degradation.

Scattering by particulates between an observer and a distant object impairs visibility much more readily. They scatter light from the sun and the rest of the sky through the line of sight of the observer, thereby decreasing the contrast between the object and the background sky. Particles that are the most effective at reducing visibility (per unit aerosol mass) have diameters in the range of 0.1-1.0 μm. The effect of air molecules on visibility is minor for short visual ranges but must be taken into account for ranges above 30 km.

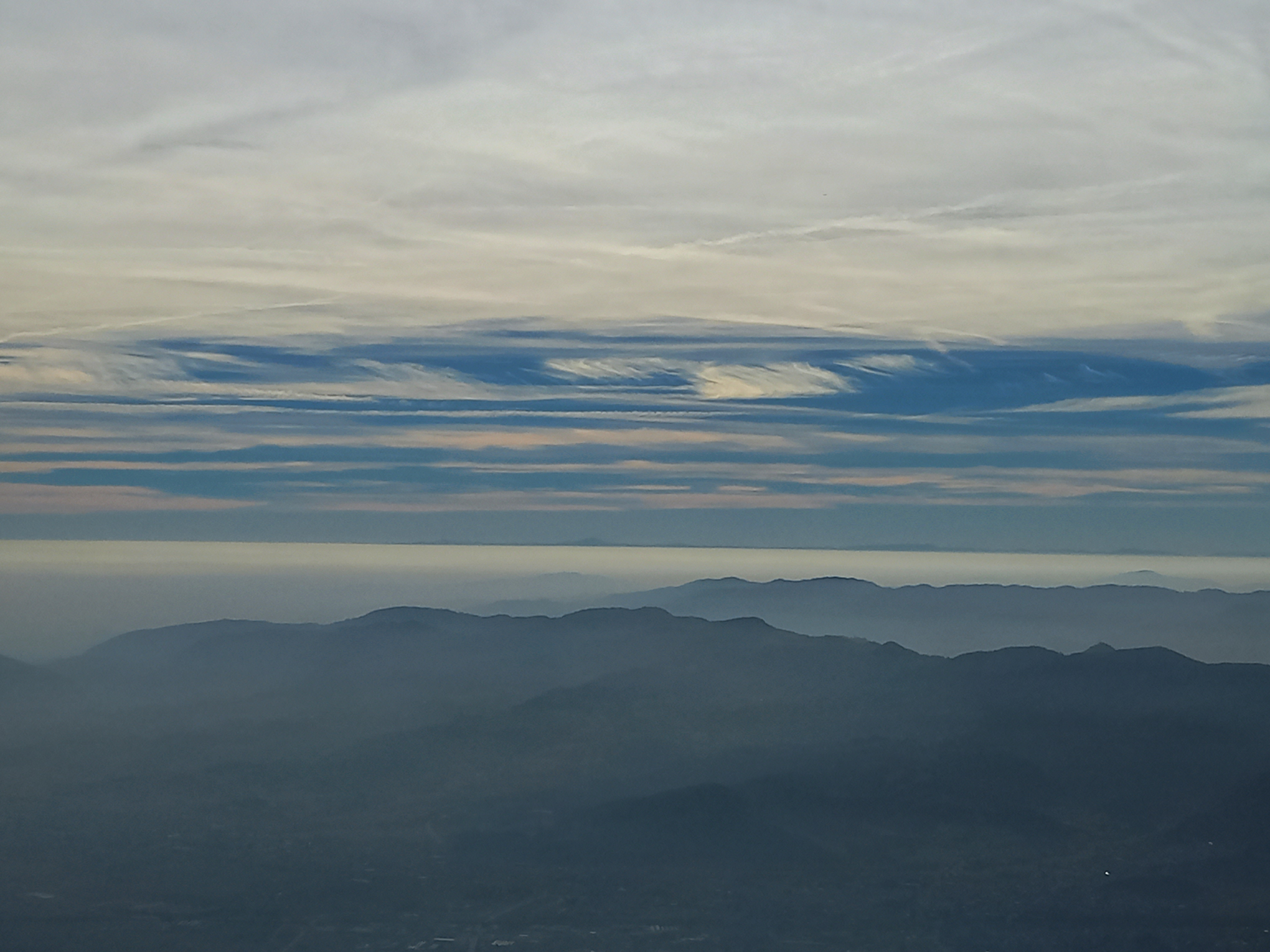
From the summit of Mount Summano (1296 m, Vicenza, Italy), it is possible to see (dark blue sky line) the Tuscan–Emilian Apennines and Mount Cimone (2165 m, Modena, Italy) in good visibility. The distance is about 180 km. Note the fog present throughout the Po Valley in the lower layers.

=== Prevailing visibility ===
Prevailing visibility is the greatest horizontal visibility equaled or exceeded throughout at least half the horizon circle, which need not necessarily be continuous. Prevailing visibility is reported in statute miles or fractions of miles.

== Geodetic visibility ==
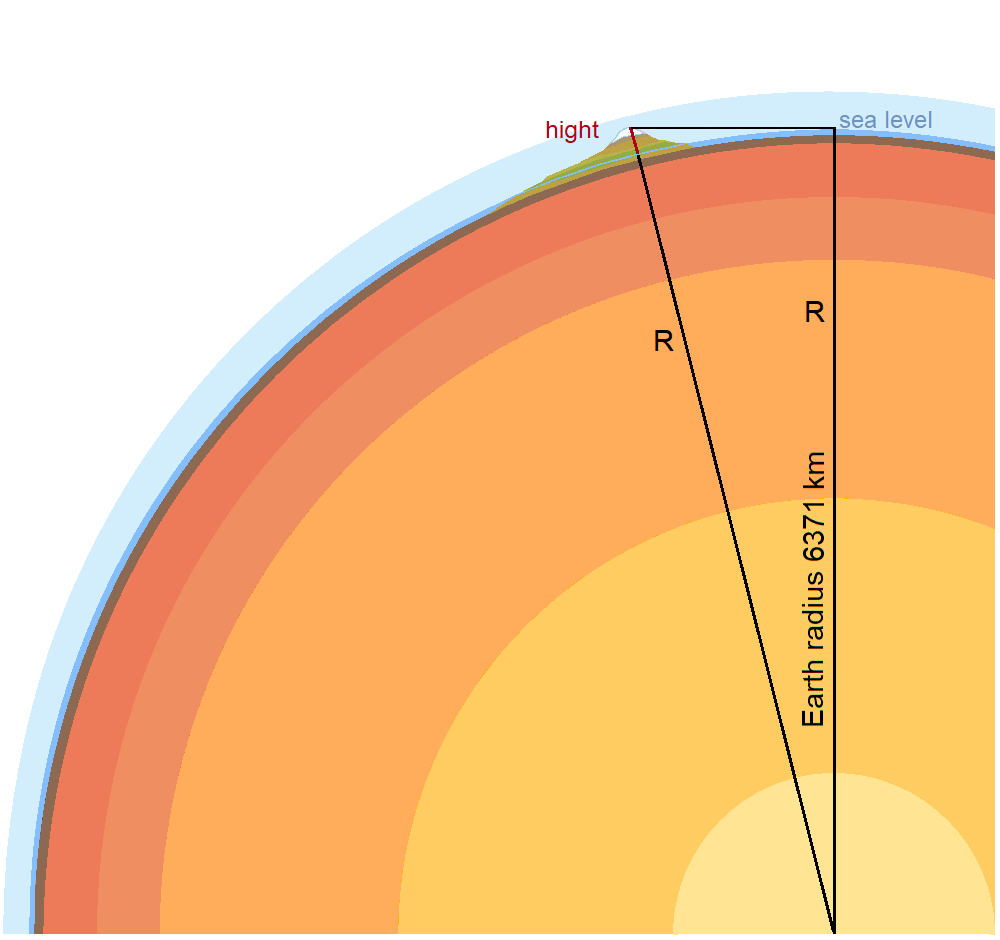

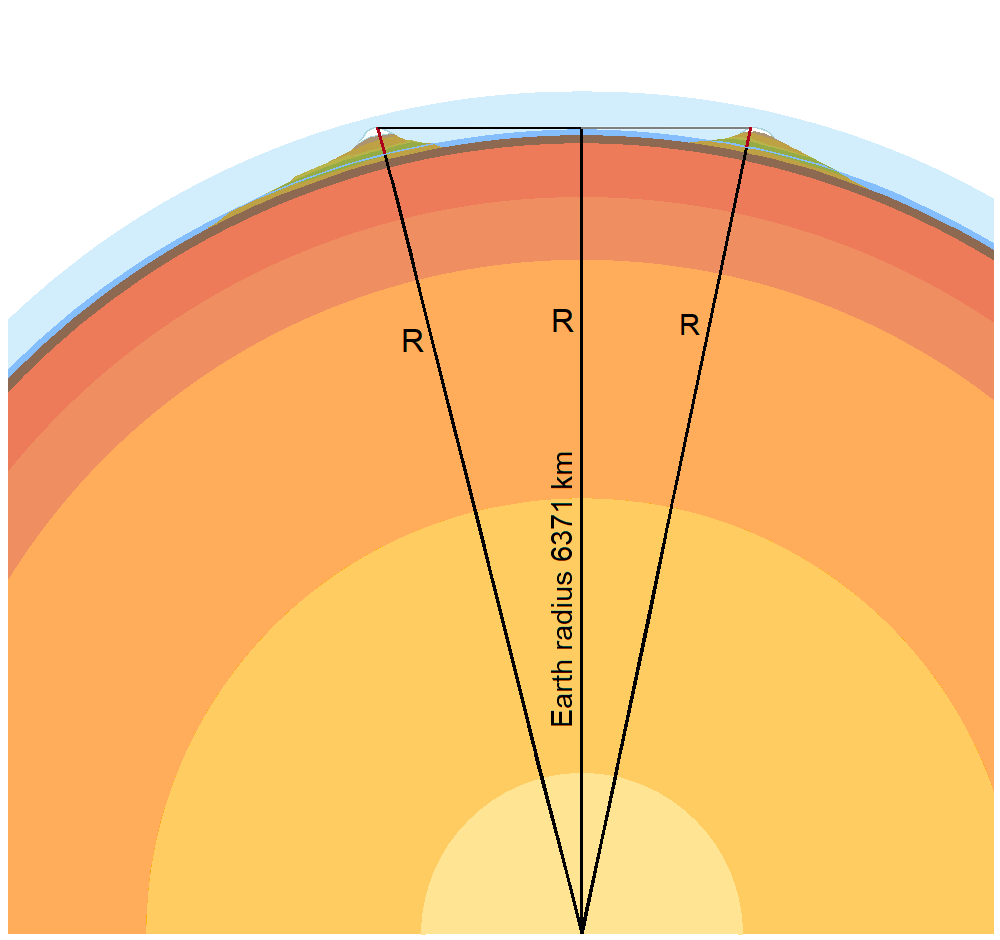

The geographical visibility depends on the altitude of the observation site and the topology of its surroundings. Planes and water surfaces provide a maximum range of vision, but vegetation, buildings and mountains are geographical obstacles that limit the geographical visibility. When the sky is clear and the meteorological visibility is high, the curvature of the earth limits the maximum possible geodetic visibility. The visibility from an elevated observation point down to the surface of the sea can be calculated using the Pythagorean theorem, since the line of sight and the radius of the Earth form the two legs of a right triangle. The height of the elevated point plus the Earth's radius form its hypotenuse. If both the eyes and the object are raised above the reference plane, there are two right-angled triangles. The tangent touching the surface of the Earth or water consists of the two short legs of the two right triangles, which are added together to calculate the geometric range of vision.

In geodesy the atmospheric refraction, which increases the range of vision, is always taken into account in the calculation, so that even objects behind the horizon can still be seen.

== See also ==
- Coefficient of haze
