= Neal Boenzi =

American photographer (1925–2023)

- Born: November 15, 1925; New York City, US
- Died: April 3, 2023 (aged 97); Santa Clarita, California, US
- Occupation: Photographer

Neal Boenzi (November 15, 1925 – April 3, 2023) was an American photojournalist who worked for the New York Times.

== Biography ==
Boenzi was born in South Brooklyn, New York, on November 15, 1925. He was one of five children of a plumber father and a mother who helped her children make bouquets out of artificial flowers at home. He dropped out of college to serve in the United States Marines during World War II. In 1946, he returned to the United States, and soon afterward began working as an "office boy" at the New York Times. Within a year, he had begun taking photos for the Times, and in 1955, he was promoted to staff photographer at the paper. He quit working at the Times in 1991 because they wanted to give him a computer. He has two children, a daughter named Jeanette born in 1951, and a son named John born in 1954.

Boenzi died on April 3, 2023, at a care facility in the Newhall neighborhood of Santa Clarita, California, at the age of 97.

== Recognition ==
Boenzi was a member of the New York Press Photographers Association, and he came in third place in the "feature" category of their 1973 contest, which honored the best New York photographs of 1972. His photograph of the 1966 New York City smog, taken facing south from the Empire State Building in November 1966, was used for the cover art of the 2013 Vampire Weekend album Modern Vampires of the City. Nancy Lee, who served as Boenzi's editor at the Times, described him in 2010 as "one of the best photographers who ever walked through the doors of The New York Times". In 2013, some of his photographs were featured in the "Vintage Boenzi" exhibit at Jadite Galleries in Manhattan. A 2015 article in Juxtapoz described Boenzi as "an inventive, charismatic and empathetic figure in photography" and stated that his "photographs of the once New York mayor, Edward I. Koch, are among the best ever taken." Koch himself kept one such photograph, taken in 1979, displayed in his office prominently. The photo had been displayed on the Times' front page on June 13, 1979. In 2010, Koch reflected that "The picture delights me because it does the following: reminds me of my youth; because of lighting, it has a star at the top of the baton; it captures the mood and environment of a small town, whilst taken in the international capital of the world."
