= Coefficient of haze =

The coefficient of haze (also known as smoke shade) is a measurement of visibility interference in the atmosphere.

One way to measure this is to draw about 1000 cubic feet of air sample through an air filter and obtain the radiation intensity through the filter. The coefficient is then calculated based on the absorbance formula

$$COH = -100 \log_{10} \left ( \frac{I_1}{I_0} \right )$$

where $I_1$ is the radiation (400 nm light) intensity transmitted through the sampled filter, and $I_0$ is the radiation intensity transmitted through a clean (control) filter.
