= Novakov =

Novakov is a surname. Notable people with the surname include:

- Andrey Novakov (born 1988), Bulgarian politician
- Anna Novakov (born 1959), Serbian-American art historian and curator
- Anton Novakov (died 1938), Bessarabian industrialist and politician
- Boncho Novakov (born 1935), Bulgarian cyclist
- Dusan Novakov (fl. 1968), Yugoslavian rugby union footballer - see List of SFR Yugoslavia national rugby union players
- Tihomir Novakov (1929–2015), Serbian-born American physicist
- Vlatko Novakov (born 1978), Macedonian footballer
