= Aethalometer =

Instrument for measuring particle concentration

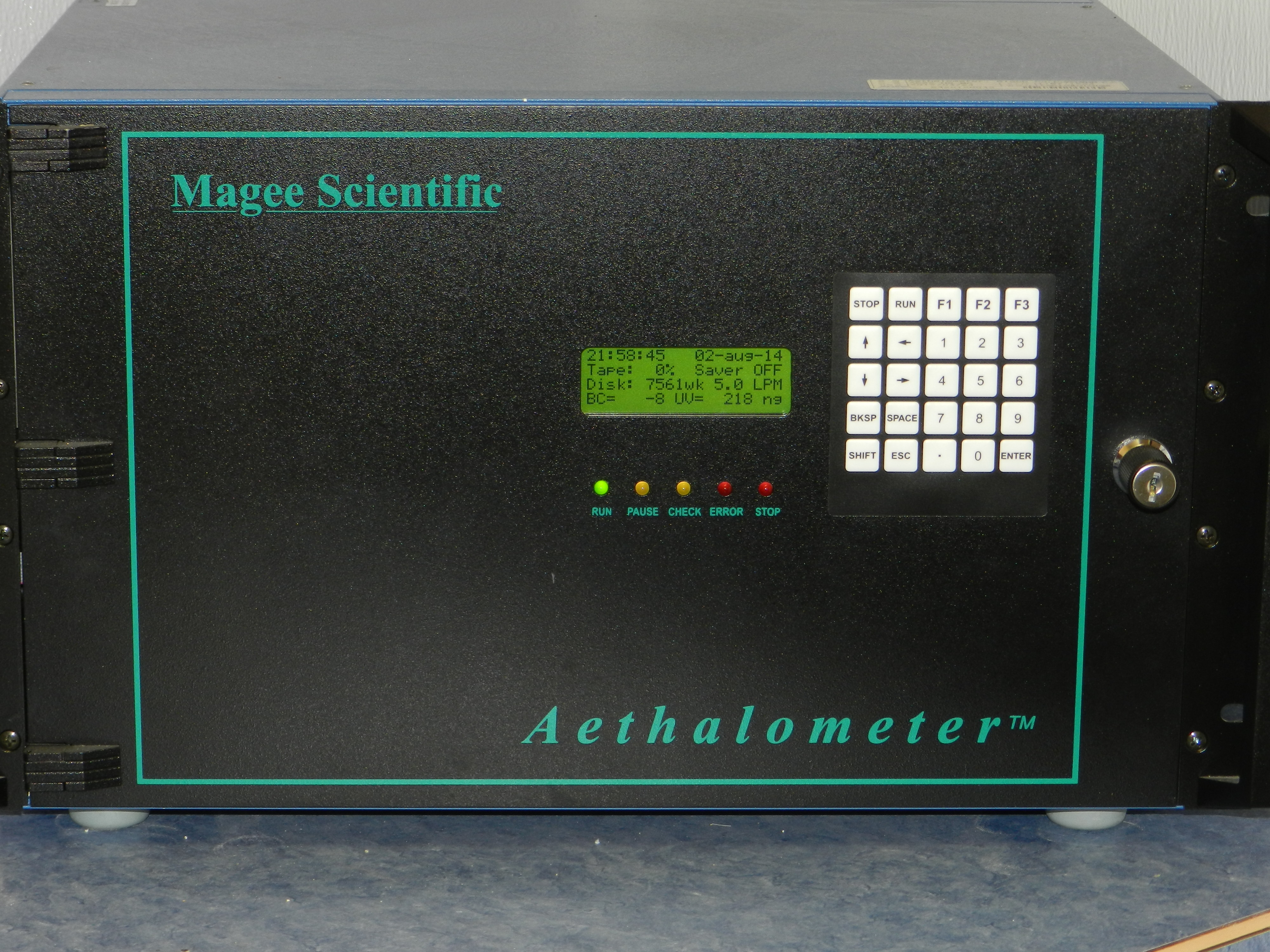
The exterior of an aethalometer

An aethalometer is an instrument for measuring the concentration of optically absorbing (‘black’) suspended particulates in a gas colloid stream; commonly visualized as smoke or haze, often seen in ambient air under polluted conditions. The word aethalometer is derived from the Classical Greek verb aethaloun, meaning "to blacken with soot". The aethalometer, a device used for measuring black carbon in atmospheric aerosols, was initially deployed in 1980 and was first commercialized by Magee Scientific.

== Principle of operation ==
The gas stream (frequently ambient air) passes through a filter material which traps the suspended particulates, creating a deposit of increasing density. A light beam projected through the deposit is attenuated by those particles which are absorbing (‘black’) rather than scattering (‘white’). Measurements are made at successive regular time intervals. The increase in attenuation from one measurement to the next is proportional to the increase in the density of optically absorbing material on the filter: which, in turn, is proportional to the concentration of the material in the sampled air stream. The sample is collected as a spot on a roll of filter tape. When the density of the deposit spot reaches a pre-set limit, the tape advances to a fresh spot and the measurements continue. Measurement of the sample gas flow rate and knowledge of the instrument's optical and mechanical characteristics permit a calculation of the average concentration of absorbing particles in the gas stream during the sampling period. Aethalometers may operate on timebase periods as rapid as 1 second, providing quasi-real-time data. Comparison of aethalometer data with other physical and chemical analyses allows the output to be expressed as a concentration of black carbon.

== History ==
The aethalometer principle is based upon the continuous filter-tape sampler developed in the 1950s for the measurement of coefficient of haze. This instrument drew the sample air stream through a filter tape spot for a fixed time duration (usually 1 or 2 hours). The tape was advanced and its gray coloration measured optically by either transmittance or reflectance. However, the data units were arbitrary, and were not interpreted in terms of a mass concentration of a defined material in the air stream until retrospective studies linked the "COH unit" to quantitative analyses of atmospheric trace constituents.

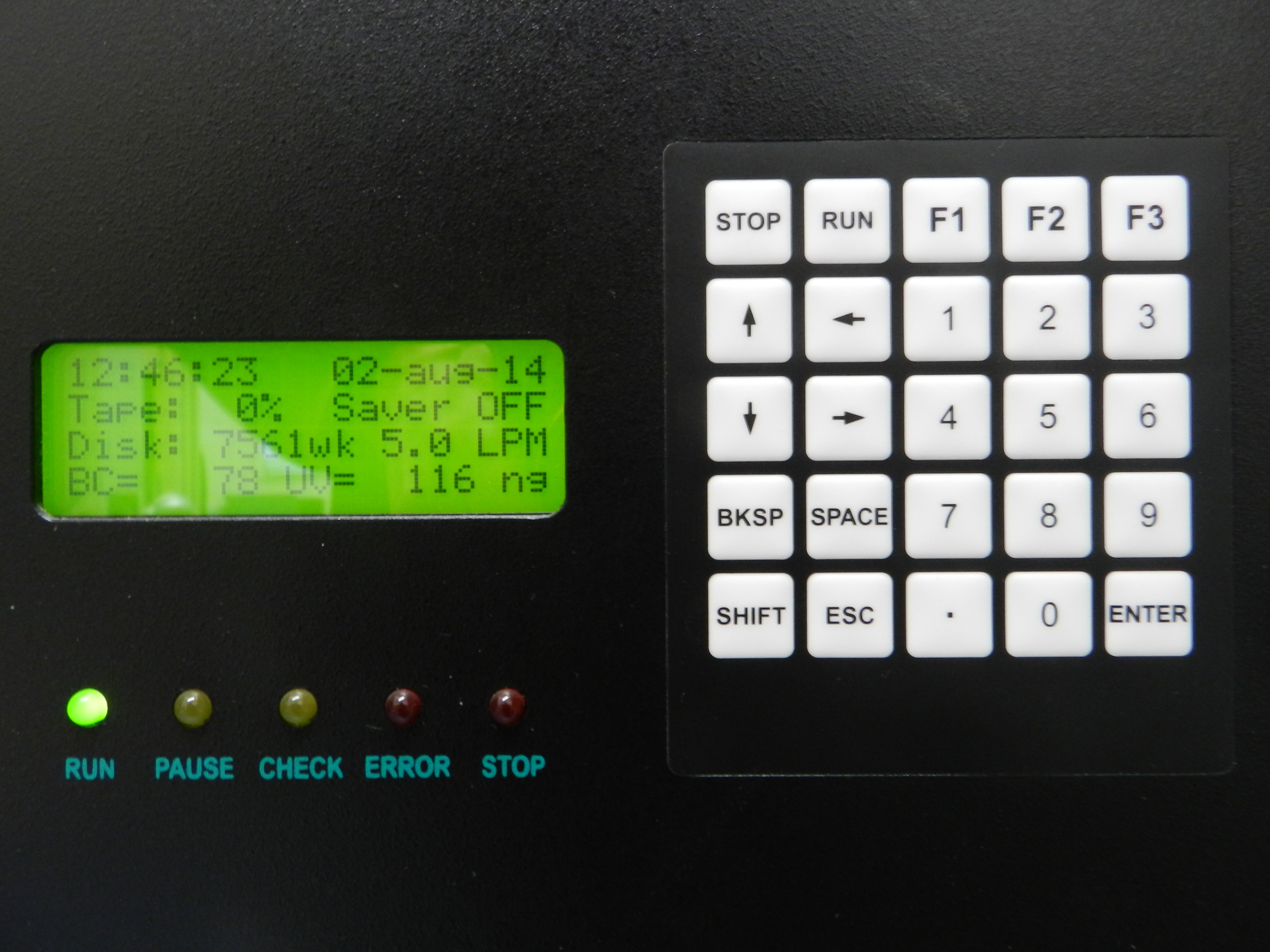
Close up of an aethalometer control panel

Work in the 1970s at Tihomir Novakov's lab at the Lawrence Berkeley National Laboratory established the quantitative relationship between the optical attenuation of a deposit of particles on a fibrous filter, and the carbon content of that deposit. Improvements in optical and electronic technology permitted the measurement of very small increases in attenuation, such as would occur during the passage of typical ambient air through a filter on a 5- or 10-minute timebase. The development of personal computers and analog-digital interfaces permitted the real-time calculation of data, and mathematical conversion of the signals to a concentration of black carbon expressed in units of nanograms or micrograms of black carbon per cubic meter of air.

The first-ever aethalometer was developed at the Lawrence Berkeley National Laboratory by Anthony D. A. Hansen (who would later found Magee Scientific), Hal Rosen and Tihomir Novakov, and was utilised in an EPA visibility study at Houston in September 1980, with the first real-time data chart of black carbon concentrations in ambient air published in 1981. The instrument was first flown on board a NOAA research aircraft in the Arctic in 1984, and coupled with previous ground-level work showed that the Arctic haze contains a strong component of soot.

The aethalometer was commercialized in 1986 and an improved version patented in 1988. Its earliest uses were in geophysical research at remote locations, using black carbon as a tracer of the long-range transport of air pollution from industrialized source areas to remote receptor regions. In the 1990s, increasing concerns about the health effects of diesel exhaust particulates led to increasing need for measurements using the blackness of the carbon content as an indicator. In the 2000s, increasing interest in the role that optically absorbing particles play in climate change led to expanded measurement programs in both developed and developing countries. The effect of these particles is believed to contribute to the accelerated melting of the Arctic and the thawing of glaciers in the Himalayas.

A comprehensive summary of black carbon (including a review of aethalometer data) was submitted to the U.S. Congress by the U.S. Environmental Protection Agency in 2012.

The aethalometer has been developed into rack-mounted instruments for use in stationary air quality monitoring installations; transportable instruments which are often used at off-grid locations, operating from batteries or photovoltaic panels in order to make measurements at remote locations; and hand-held portable versions for measurements of personal exposure to combustion emissions.

== Technical background and aethalometer use ==
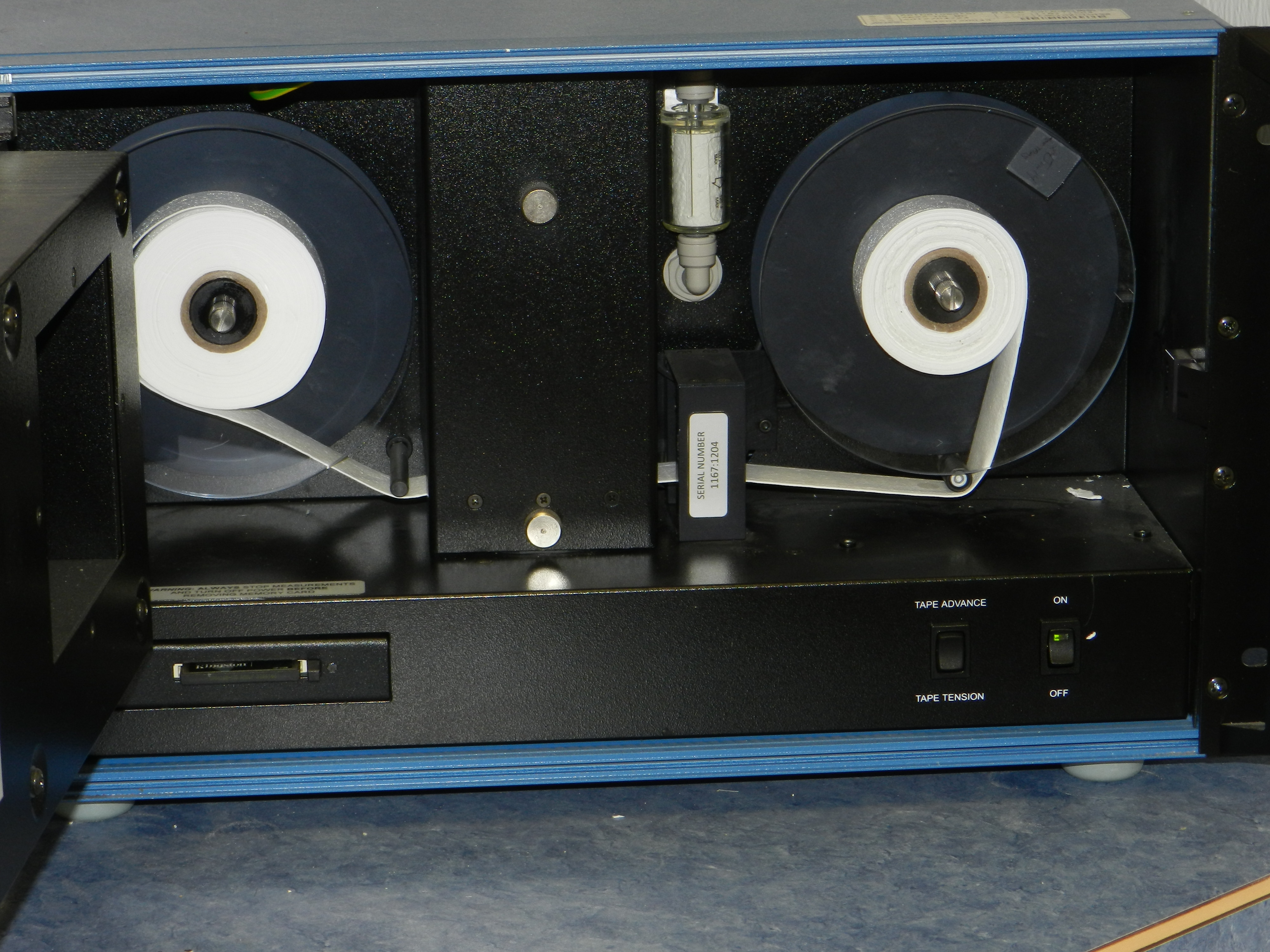
The interior of an aethalometer

=== Aethalometer uses ===
The main uses of aethalometers relate to air quality measurements, with the data being used for studies of the impact of air pollution on public health; climate change; and visibility. Other uses include measurements of the emission of black carbon from combustion sources such as vehicles; industrial processes; and biomass burning, both in wild fires and in domestic and industrial settings.

=== Technical validation ===
The Aethalometer Model AE-31 was tested by the Environmental Technology Verification Program administered by the U.S. Environmental Protection Agency, and a validation report was issued in 2001. The Aethalometer Model AE-33 was tested under the same program in 2013, report pending.

=== Analysis at multiple optical wavelengths: angstrom exponent ===
The pollutant species black carbon appears gray or black due to the absorption of electromagnetic energy by partially mobile electrons in the graphitic microstructure of the black carbon particles. This absorption is purely ‘resistive’ and displays no resonant bands: consequently, the material appears gray rather than colored. The attenuation of light transmitted through a deposit of these particles increases linearly with the frequency of the electromagnetic radiation, i.e. inversely with respect to wavelength. Aethalometer measurements of optical attenuation on a filter deposit will increase at shorter wavelengths as λ^{(-α)} where the parameter α (the Angstrom exponent) has the value α = 1 for ‘gray’ or ‘black’ materials. However, other species may be co-mingled with the black carbon particles. Aromatic organic compounds associated with tobacco smoke and biomass smoke from wood-burning are known to have increased optical absorption at shorter wavelengths in the yellow, blue and near-ultraviolet portions of the spectrum.

Aethalometers are now constructed to perform their optical analyses simultaneously at multiple wavelengths, typically spanning the range from 370 nm (near-ultraviolet) to 950 nm (near-infrared). In the absence of aromatic components, the aethalometer data for black carbon concentration is identical at all wavelengths, after factoring in the standard λ^{−1} response for ‘resistive’ gray materials. The angstrom exponent of the attenuation for these materials is 1. If aromatic components are present, they will contribute increased absorption at shorter wavelengths. The aethalometer data will increase at shorter wavelengths, and the apparent angstrom exponent will increase. Measurements of pure biomass smoke may show data represented by an angstrom exponent as large as 2. Due to different artifacts, the angstrom exponent measured by aethalometers might be biased but comparison with other techniques have found that the aethalometer model AE-31 provides fair absorption angstrom exponent results. Many areas of the world are impacted by emissions both from high-temperature fossil fuel combustion, such as diesel exhaust, which has a gray or black color and is characterized by an angstrom exponent of 1; together with emissions from biomass burning such as wood smoke, which is characterized by a larger value of angstrom exponent. These two sources of pollution may have different geographic origins and temporal patterns, but maybe co-mingled at the point of measurement. Real-time aethalometer measurements at multiple wavelengths are claimed to separate these different contributions and can apportion the total impact to different categories of sources. This analysis is an essential input to the design of effective and acceptable public policy and regulation.

The accuracy, and even the ability, of the aethalometer to differentiate smoke sources is disputed.

=== Aethalometer measurements at diverse locations ===
The aethalometer measurement principle is based upon air filtration, optics, and electronics. It does not require any physical or chemical support infrastructure such as high vacuum, high temperature, or specialized reagents or gases. Its only consumable is a filter which needs to be replaced every one or two days in portable models, but larger units have a roll of filtration tape which usually lasts from months to years. Consequently, the instrument is rugged, miniaturizable and may be deployed in research projects at remote locations, or at sites with minimal local support. Examples include:

- measurements at South Pole Station, the location at which the cleanest air has been measured with an aethalometer, showing black carbon concentrations on the order of 30 picograms per cubic meter in winter;
- measurements in urban locations in China and Bangladesh, at which the concentrations of black carbon can often exceed 100 micrograms per cubic meter;
- measurements at rural locations in Africa, with installations operating from solar photovoltaic panels and registering high concentrations of black carbon due to agricultural burning;
- measurements at high-altitude installations in both the Indian Himalayas and Tibet at heights exceeding 5,000 metres (3.1 miles), operating from solar photovoltaic panels and registering the impact of combustion emissions from adjacent densely populated lowland areas;
- measurements on board commercial aircraft flights using a hand-held aethalometer, in which the in-cabin presence of black carbon is derived from the external concentrations in the stratosphere: in which manner, it is possible to map the dispersion of black carbon on a global scale at 10 km (6.2 mi) altitude without the need for extremely expensive dedicated research aircraft;
- measurements taken from automobiles, trains, light aircraft and tethered balloons, from which the real-time data may be converted to horizontal and vertical mapping;
- measurements at a station in the midst of the Taklimakan Desert of Central Asia, a location almost as remote and inhospitable as the South Pole.
- measurements taken with a micro-aethalometer while cycling in traffic Bangalore, India.
- measurements combined with heart rate and minute ventilation sensors to study inhalation exposure.

Some measurements are available as Open Data:

- personal exposure measurements with microaethalometers from Belgium
