= Environmental Technology Verification Program =

Environmental Technology Verification (ETV) consists of the verification of the performance of environmental technologies through testing using established protocols or specific requirements. This process is carried out by qualified third parties, and several ETV programs are being run worldwide. These programs are organized through government initiatives, with the United States of America and Canada being among the pioneers. Other programs are being run in South Korea, Japan, Bangladesh, Denmark, France, Europe, the Philippines, and China. However, each program has its own definitions, structure and procedures, and programs are not always compatible with one another. In 2007, an ETV International Working Group was formed to work on the convergence of the different programs towards mutual recognition. The group's motto was Verified once, verified everywhere. The group's work led to a request for drafting an ETV ISO standard, resulting in establishing an ISO working group under Technical Committee 207 (Environmental Management), Sub-committee 4, Working Group 5 - Environmental Technology Verification (ISO/TC 207/SC 4/WG 5). The ISO standard will have the number ISO/NP 14034 once completed.

== The US ETV Program ==
The Environmental Technology Verification (ETV) Program of the Environmental Protection Agency (EPA) in the United States develops testing protocols and verifies the performance of innovative environmental technologies that can address problems that threaten human health or the natural environment. ETV was created to accelerate the entrance of new environmental technologies into the domestic and international marketplace by providing objective technology information on commercial-ready technologies. ETV is a voluntary program. Developers/vendors of environmental technologies are not required to participate in the program, nor are they required to seek verification. ETV does not pass or fail and does not rank technologies. All verification reports and statements are made publicly available on the ETV Website.

=== Centers ===
ETV has five centers called verification organizations, which are run through a cooperative agreement: Advanced Monitoring Systems center, Air Pollution Control Technology center, Drinking Water Systems center, Greenhouse Gas Technology center, and Water Quality Protection center.

==== Environmental and Sustainable Technology Technology Verifications (ESTE) ====
A component of ETV which was added in 2005 to address priority environmental technology categories for meeting the USEPA needs for credible performance information. Priority is given to technologies that can address high-risk environmental problems.

=== ETV Accomplishments, impacts, and outcomes ===
ETV has verified over 400 technologies and developed more than 90 protocols. A survey of participating vendors completed in 2001 showed overwhelming support for the ETV program. Responses indicated that 73 percent of the vendors were using ETV information in product marketing, and 92 percent of those surveyed responded that they would recommend ETV to other vendors.

In 2006, EPA published a two-volume set of case studies which document actual and projected outcomes from verifications of technologies in 15 technology categories (ETV Program Case Studies Vol 1 EPA/600/R-06/001 and ETV Program Case Studies Vol II EPA/600/R-06/082).

An Association of State Drinking Water Administrators (ASDWA) survey showed that 34 states recognize and use ETV reports. ASDWA and its members rely heavily on these evaluations to support the use of new technologies and products in the drinking water industry.

Designating a product or technology as ETV “verified” does not mean a given technology reduces every emission, has no drawbacks, or outperforms solutions not on the “verified” list.

Designating a product or technology as “verified” means that a given technology produced “X” outcome, when tested according to a specific protocol.

=== Verified diesel emission reduction technologies and their outcomes ===
- Biodiesel: Reduced inorganic (soot) carbon emissions, Increased NOx emissions - Increased organic carbon (SOF / VOC) emissions.
- Diesel Particulate Filter (various manufacturers): Reduces TPM, Does Not Address NOx.
- Diesel Oxidation Catalyst (various manufacturers) : Reduces TPM, Does Not Address NOx.
- Clean Diesel Technologies fuel borne catalyst: potential fine metallic emissions & potential resulting health effects - need PM filter - minimal NOx reduction.
- Purinox - water / diesel fuel emulsion: PM/HC/CO emissions can increase as a result of tuning to compensate for decreased power- only summer blend verified.
- Envirofuels Diesel Fuel Catalyzer: verified on tier 0 locomotive engine - verification report specifies an increase in total particulate (TPM) emissions on the treated fuel, as compared to the baseline fuel, even though the gaseous emissions and visible smoke opacity decreased significantly.
- Envirofuels diesel fuel catalyzer showed a verified fuel consumption reduction.

=== Composition of total diesel particulate matter and the relation to smoke opacity ===
The composition of TPM (total diesel particulate matter) is the sum of "dry" particulates, and "wet" particulates.

"Dry" Particulate emissions are also known as inorganic soot, black carbon, or elemental carbon.

"Wet" particulates are also known as organic carbon, soluble organic fractions (SOFs) and volatile organic compounds (VOCs).

The exact ratio of "wet to dry" diesel particulate matter will vary by engine load, duty cycle, fuel composition and specification, and engine tuning.

An opacity reading is a measurement of the level of visible inorganic carbon, also known as soot. Opacity measurements cannot detect organic carbon emissions, VOC / SOF emissions, or NOx emissions.

Specialized instrumentation is required to determine organic carbon levels, and to detect other unseen particulates. When used in conjunction with an opacity meter, the technician can detect (for example) an increase in TPM, and detect a decrease in visible smoke (opacity) emissions.

=== Function as a neutral clearinghouse ===
The ETV verification program (and other verification pathways) publish the verification reports, technology options charts, and technical summaries, once testing has been completed.

The ETV testing facility will issue press releases on behalf of the technology vendor, upon completion of testing.

The ETV verification program reports all outcomes, and leaves the ultimate decision regarding the suitability and applicability of a given technology to the discretion of the end user. Additional research may be necessary in order to adequately address specific situations.

== ETV in Europe ==
ETV has been developed in different European countries as part of government initiatives and/or as part of funded research projects. Research projects included TESTNET, PROMOTE, AIR ETV, TRITECH ETV and ADVANCE ETV. Formal programs and initiatives took place in Denmark with the Danish Centre for Environmental Technology Verification (DANETV), the Nordic countries, including Denmark, Sweden, Finland and Norway, with the Nordic Environmental Technology Verification (NOWATEC) project, in France with the French ETV program and in a partnership between Denmark, The Netherlands and Germany with the Verification of Environmental Technologies for Agricultural Production (VERA). The European Union launched in 2011 an ETV Pilot Programme with the support from seven EU member states: Belgium, Czech Republic, Denmark, Finland, France, Poland and United Kingdom. This initiative was initially prepared under the Environmental Technologies Action Plan (ETAP) from the European Commission and was then followed under the Eco-Innovation Plan.

The European Commission has taken the decision to discontinue its work on the ETV programme as of November 2022, following an internal assessment.

=== The European Union ETV Pilot program ===
Environmental Technology Verification (ETV) is a new tool to help innovative environmental technologies reach the market. Claims about the performance of innovative environmental technologies can be verified by qualified third parties called "Verification Bodies ". The "Statement of Verification " delivered at the end of the ETV process can be used as evidence that the claims made about the innovation are both credible and scientifically sound. With proof of performance credibly assured, innovations can expect an easier market access and/or a larger market share and the technological risk is reduced for technology purchasers.

=== ETV in the UK ===
Under the EU-ETV Pilot Programme, there are four Verification Bodies:

- The European Marine Energy Centre: EMEC-ETV
- BRE Global:
- National Physical Laboratory (NPL)
- Water Research Centre (WRC)
