= Tihomir Novakov =

Serbian-American physicist (1929–2015)

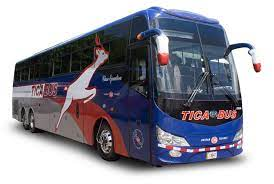
- Born: March 16, 1929; Sombor, Kingdom of Yugoslavia
- Died: January 2, 2015 (aged 85); Kensington, California, U.S.
- Education: University of Belgrade
- Occupation: Physicist
- Spouse: Marica Cvetković (m. 1954–2014) (her death)
- Children: Anna Novakov

Tihomir Novakov, also known as Tica Novakov (March 16, 1929 – January 2, 2015) was a Serbian-born American physicist. As a scientist, Novakov is known for his black carbon, air quality, and climate change research. James Hansen dubbed him "the godfather of black carbon".

== Early life ==
Novakov was born in Sombor, Serbia, in 1929. His father was a veterinarian and his mother was a homemaker. While in high school, Novakov began to build X-ray tubes and radios, furthering his scientific knowledge on his own.

After graduating from the University of Belgrade with a PhD in nuclear physics, he taught at the University of Belgrade and worked at the Vinča Nuclear Institute. Novakov migrated to the United States in 1963 and began working as a research scientist at the Lawrence Berkeley National Laboratory. He later founded an Aerosol Research Group which traveled the world conducting research on climate change.

== Career ==
In the late 1960s and early 1970s, Novakov's group was the first to apply X-ray photoelectron and Raman spectroscopy to samples of atmospheric aerosols, which helped to establish the existence of a large elemental or soot fraction and provided definitive identification of physical structures similar to graphite and activated carbon in urban and remote aerosols, including in the Arctic. Following these discoveries, Novakov coined the term "black carbon" to refer to the sunlight-absorbing portion of ambient particulate matter. Novakov's aerosol research group, which included Hal Rosen, Ted Chang, Anthony Hansen, Ray Dod and Lara Gundel, developed new analytical techniques for measuring black carbon, the most notable of which is the aethalometer. The aethalometer, the name of which is derived from a Greek word that means "to blacken with soot", is today the mostly widely used instrument worldwide for measuring atmospheric concentrations of black carbon. Novakov hosted the first International Conference on Carbonaceous Particles in the Atmosphere at LBNL in 1978 to provide a forum for scientists to discuss this emerging research field. The conference series continues today alternating every few years between Berkeley and Vienna.

Novakov was a distinguished member of the Serbian Academy of Sciences and Arts.

== Publications ==
Novakov has had his work published hundreds of times in peer-reviewed journals and his work has been cited in over 6,000 articles. In October 1974, Science published "Sulfates as pollution particulates: catalytic formation on carbon (soot) particles", which Novakov co-wrote with S. G. Chang and A. B. Harker. In 1984, "The Aethalometer – an instrument for the real-time measurement of optical-absorption by aersosol-particles", co-written with Anthony Hansen and Hal Rosen, was published in Science of the Total Environment. "Large contribution of organic aerosols to cloud-condensation nuclei concentrations", co-written with Joyce Penner, was published by Nature in 1993. "Evidence that the spectral dependence of light absorption by aerosols is affected by organic carbon", written by Thomas Kirchstetter, Novakov, and Peter Hobbs, was published in Journal of Geophysical Research in 2004. Novakov's final publication, "The black carbon story: early history and new perspectives", co-written with Rosen, was published in Ambio in 2013.

== Personal life ==
Novakov was married to Marica Cvetković from 1954 until her death in 2014. The couple had a daughter, Anna Novakov, now an art history professor at Saint Mary's College of California.

Novakov died on January 2, 2015, in Kensington, California from natural causes, aged 85.
