= List of SFR Yugoslavia national rugby union players =

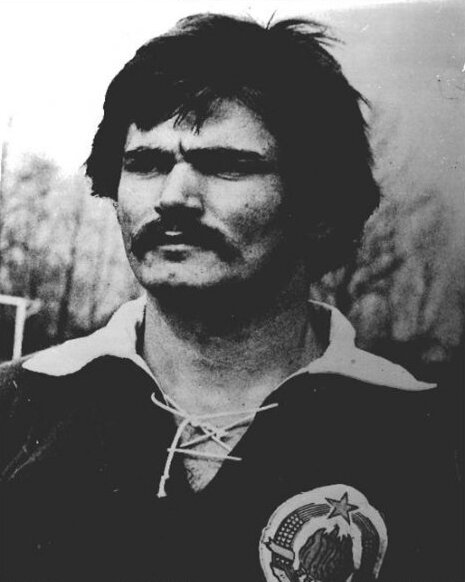
Sreto Cadjo, Plavi.No81

List of SFR Yugoslavia national rugby union players is a list of people who have played for the Yugoslavia national rugby union team. The list includes all players who have played for Yugoslavia in a Test match and official games between 1968 and 1991.

In total 226 players played for Yugoslavia in 116 games and 189 players played in 66 Test games.

Plavi No.1 is Dusan Novakov, captain in the first game played against Romania XV.

The last, Plavi No.226, Aleksandar Jakisic made debut as 18-years old in the last game, versus Czechoslovakia in 1991.

== 1 to 50 ==
Plavi No.	Name	Club	Tests (Total Games)	Test Debut	Opposition	Debut	Opposition	Test Points (Total Points)
1	Dusan Novakov	Dinamo	4(4)	1968-07-31	RomaniaXV			3(3)
2	Ratomir Milat	Nada	11(12)	1968-07-31	RomaniaXV			5(12)
3	Lazar Kovac	Dinamo	11(12)	1968-07-31	RomaniaXV			0(4)
4	Andrija Parcetic	Dinamo	1(1)	1968-07-31	RomaniaXV			
5	Mladen Veic	Nada	2(2)	1968-07-31	RomaniaXV			
6	Milorad Mijajlovic	Brodarac	6(7)	1968-07-31	RomaniaXV			
7	Marko Protega	Nada	15(18)	1968-07-31	RomaniaXV			0(4)
8	Andro Alujevic	LJubljana	9(11)	1968-07-31	RomaniaXV			0(6)
9	Dusan Kompara	Dinamo	2(2)	1968-07-31	RomaniaXV			
10	Nikola Rnjak	Nada	9(11)	1968-07-31	RomaniaXV			
11	Zika Popovic	Brodarac	4(4)	1968-07-31	RomaniaXV			12(12)
12	Maksa Jakovljev	Dinamo	6(8)	1968-07-31	RomaniaXV			3(3)
13	Vibor Tudor	Nada	1(1)	1968-07-31	RomaniaXV			
14	Jaroslav Zvekic	Dinamo	4(5)	1968-07-31	RomaniaXV			3(3)
15	Ante Staglicic	Nada	17(20)	1968-07-31	RomaniaXV			5(5)
16	Ranko Armanda	Nada	15(18)	1968-07-31	RomaniaXV			0(8)
17	Vjekoslav Rozman	Zagreb	5(6)	1968-07-31	RomaniaXV			
18	Zdravko Habus	Mladost Zagreb	3(4)	1968-08-02	Bulgaria			
19	Leonard Komac	Nada	0(1)			1968-11-30	CzechoslovakiaXV	
20	Arsen Franceschi	Nada	8(10)	1968-12-29	Italy	1968-11-30	CzechoslovakiaXV	
21	Vili Gartner	Mladost Zagreb	4(6)	1968-12-29	Italy	1968-11-30	CzechoslovakiaXV	
22	Tonci Ivanisevic	Nada	12(15)	1969-05-01	Bulgaria	1968-11-30	CzechoslovakiaXV	8(20)
23	Kajo Krstulovic	Nada	2(3)	1970-11-29	Czechoslovakia	1968-11-30	CzechoslovakiaXV	0(6)
24	Milosevic Dubravko	Zagreb	2(4)	1970-10-18	Poland	1968-11-30	CzechoslovakiaXV	
25	Leo Antonini	Nada	1(2)	1972-04-30	Spain	1968-11-30	CzechoslovakiaXV	
26	Ilija Bjelanovic	Nada	13(16)	1968-12-29	Italy	1968-11-30	CzechoslovakiaXV	3(3)
27	Miroslav Radivojevic	Dinamo	3(4)	1968-12-29	Italy	1968-11-30	CzechoslovakiaXV	6(6)
28	Ante Grubisic	Nada	5(6)	1970-10-18	Poland	1968-11-30	CzechoslovakiaXV	16(16)
29	Ante Kuvacic	Nada	1			1968-11-30	CzechoslovakiaXV	
30	Branko Radic	Nada	29(41)	1968-12-29	Italy	1968-11-30	CzechoslovakiaXV	13(28)
31	Velibor DJoric	Dinamo	4(5)	1968-12-29	Italy			3(3)
32	Dragan Kesic	Dinamo	30(42)	1968-12-29	Italy			18(26)
33	Tomislav Ivancev	Nada	1(2)	1968-12-29	Italy			
34	Milorad Malesevic	Mladost Zagreb	1(1)	1969-05-01	Bulgaria			
35	Rudi Bartolic	Zagreb	11(12)	1969-05-01	Bulgaria			13(23)
36	DJoka Marinkovic	Dinamo	3(3)	1969-05-01	Bulgaria			
37	Milan Dekleva	LJubljana	1(1)	1970-04-05	Poland			
38	Zoran Osljanac	Dinamo	2(2)	1970-04-05	Poland			
39	Suad Kapetanovic	Zagreb	3(3)	1970-10-18	Poland			
40	Jakov Radic	Nada	2(2)	1970-10-18	Poland			
41	Ivan Totar	Zagreb	2(2)	1970-10-18	Poland			
42	Vjekoslav Arambasic	Metka	10(11)	1970-10-18	Poland			14(14)
43	Ante Zekan	Nada	20(33)	1970-10-18	Poland			8(16)
44	Zdenko Jajcevic	Zagreb	7(11)	1970-10-24	Czechoslovakia			4(8)
45	Petar Dabic	Brodarac	1(1)	1970-11-29	Czechoslovakia			
46	Radimir Guina	Nada	5(6)	1971-12-05	Spain			4(4)
47	Slobodan Radic	Dinamo	11(12)	1971-12-05	Spain			4(4)
48	Danilo Markez	Dinamo	6(7)	1972-04-30	Spain			
49	Ivan Sikic	Mladost Zagreb	4(5)	1972-11-15	Belgium			
50	Milan Horvat	LJubljana	1(1)	1972-11-15	Belgium			

== 50 to 100 ==
Plavi No.	Name	Club	Tests (Total Games)	Test Debut	Opposition	Debut	Opposition	Test Points (Total Points)
51	Velimir Skledar	Zagreb	1(2)	1972-11-19	Netherlands			
52	Ivica Alebic	Nada	2(3)	1972-11-19	Netherlands			
53	Tonci Cvitanovic	Nada	2(2)	1972-11-19	Netherlands			
54	Aleksandar Mitrovic	Brodarac	1(1)	1973-10-21	Czechoslovakia			
55	Dragan Lazic	Dinamo	4(5)	1973-10-21	Czechoslovakia			7(7)
56	Franjo Marjanovic	Mladost Zagreb	1(1)	1973-10-21	Czechoslovakia			
57	Dragan Bojovic	LJubljana	3(3)	1973-10-21	Czechoslovakia			6(6)
58	Nikola Stancevic	Dinamo	44(81)	1973-10-21	Czechoslovakia			34(42)
59	Sekula Simic	Dinamo	1(1)	1973-11-11	Italy			
60	Zeljko Filipcic	Mladost Zagreb	7(13)	1973-11-11	Italy			11(43)
61	Nikola Tepic	Dinamo	13(20)	1973-11-11	Italy			13(17)
62	Veseljko Simic	Energoinvest	1(1)	1974-05-01	West Germany			
63	Mile Kratocwil	LJubljana	1(1)	1974-05-01	West Germany			
64	Borut Kurtovic	Energoinvest	1(1)	1974-05-01	West Germany			
65	Kosta Filipov	Dinamo	1(1)	1974-05-01	West Germany			
66	Dragan Stankovic	Dinamo	1(1)	1974-05-01	West Germany			
67	Slobodan Cizmic	Mladost Zagreb	1(1)	1974-05-01	West Germany			
68	Dragutin Strgar	Zagreb	5(13)	1975-10-26	Czechoslovakia	1974-10-24	Waitemata RC	
69	Ivan Katalenic	Zagreb	5(15)	1978-10-15	Sweden	1974-10-24	Waitemata RC	4(16)
70	Bojan Zeleznikar	LJubljana	7(12)	1975-10-26	Czechoslovakia	1974-10-24	Waitemata RC	12(12)
71	Darko Miskulin	Zagreb	1(2)	1975-10-26	Czechoslovakia	1974-10-24	Waitemata RC	0(3)
72	Zeljko Pavlinec	Zagreb	8(16)	1975-10-26	Czechoslovakia	1974-10-24	Waitemata RC	3(32)
73	Ivan Pijasek	Zagreb	1			1974-10-24	Waitemata RC	
74	Dubravko Gerovac	Zagreb	16(30)	1975-10-26	Czechoslovakia	1974-10-24	Waitemata RC	28(68)
75	Marinko Mucic	Energoinvest	5(8)	1975-10-26	Czechoslovakia	1974-10-24	Waitemata RC	4(4)
76	Stanko Damjanovic	Zagreb	1			1974-10-24	Waitemata RC	
77	Ivan Listes	Nada	3(7)	1975-10-26	Czechoslovakia	1974-10-24	Waitemata RC	
78	Milan Jelenic	Zagreb	1			1974-10-24	Waitemata RC	
79	Zlatko Zver	LJubljana	16(30)	1975-10-26	Czechoslovakia			0(4)
80	Branimir Marovic	Nada	9(16)	1976-04-25	Switzerland			0(4)
81	Sreto Cadjo	Celik	16(22)	1976-04-25	Switzerland			4(12)
82	Andro Muric	Zagreb	2(2)	1976-12-08	Belgium			12(12)
83	Slobodan Kostanic	Energoinvest	6(13)	1976-12-11	Switzerland			4(8)
84	Milan Cvetkovic	Dinamo	10(20)	1978-05-14	Soviet Union	1977-11-25	Universitatea	
85	Nenad Kecman	Partizan	2(5)	1980-05-03	West Germany	1977-11-25	Universitatea	
86	Goran Trkulja	Zagreb	13(23)	1978-05-14	Soviet Union	1977-11-25	Universitatea	0(4)
87	Goran Bozickovic	Partizan	3(6)	1978-10-15	Sweden	1977-11-25	Universitatea	
88	Borislav Maric	Sisak	7(12)	1979-09-20	FranceXV	1977-11-27	Timișoara Sel.	0(8)
89	Dubravko Lovrencic	Zagreb	6(8)	1978-05-14	Soviet Union			11(11)
90	Drago Lulic	Energoinvest	13(18)	1978-05-14	Soviet Union			8(12)
91	Mladen Lukovic	Dinamo	9(10)	1978-12-02	Netherlands			8(8)
92	Milenko Jeftic	Dinamo	4(4)	1979-09-16	Tunisia			
93	Dusan Panic	Zagreb	19(22)	1979-09-20	FranceXV			12(32)
94	Marjan Vuk	Dinamo	4(4)	1979-11-17	RomaniaXV			
95	Vili Staresina	Zagreb	6(8)	1979-11-17	RomaniaXV			
96	Bosko Strugar	Partizan	4(5)	1979-11-17	RomaniaXV			(4)
97	Muharem Gafurovic	Celik	3(6)	1979-11-17	RomaniaXV			(8)
98	Tihomir Vranesevic	Zagreb	29(55)	1979-11-17	RomaniaXV			16(4)
99	Zoran DJuric	Partizan	1(1)	1979-11-17	RomaniaXV			
100	Velimir Zlokolica	Dinamo	1(1)	1979-11-17	RomaniaXV			

== 101 to 150 ==
Plavi No.	Name	Club	Tests (Total Games)	Test Debut	Opposition	Debut	Opposition	Test Points (Total Points)
101	Damir Buzov	Nada	20(49)	1979-11-17	RomaniaXV			8
102	Nikola Kosanovic	Koloy's	4(5)	1979-12-16	Netherlands			
103	Ante Lovic	Energoinvest	2(2)	1980-05-03	West Germany			
104	Vinko Labrovic	Nada	27(62)	1980-05-03	West Germany			33(71)
105	Dubravko Pesut	Zagreb	11(18)	1980-05-03	West Germany			30(65)
106	Damir Uzunovic	Celik	22(42)	1980-05-03	West Germany			12(44)
107	Zdravko Mijic	Zagreb	2(4)	1980-11-30	West Germany	1980-10-03	RC Valencia	
108	Damir Zrinscak	Zagreb	9(15)	1980-11-30	West Germany	1980-10-03	RC Valencia	
109	Milos Piletic	Partizan	2			1980-10-03	RC Valencia	
110	Marjan Putanec	Zagreb	10(16)	1980-11-30	West Germany	1980-10-03	RC Valencia	16(24)
111	Dusan Jaukovic	Partizan	2			1980-10-03	RC Valencia	(8)
112	Zoran Blazevac	Zagreb	4(6)	1982-09-18	Tunisia	1980-10-03	RC Valencia	(4)
113	Zoran Prijic	Zagreb	2(4)	1980-11-30	West Germany	1980-10-03	RC Valencia	(4)
114	Drago Vlahovic	Zagreb	2			1980-10-03	RC Valencia	(4)
115	Zivan Apostolovski	Dinamo	5			1980-10-18	Hrvatska	(4)
116	Zivan Pesic	Dinamo	3(6)	1981-11-29	Belgium	1980-10-18	Hrvatska	
117	Mirko Reljic	Dinamo	3(6)	1980-11-30	West Germany	1980-10-18	Hrvatska	(8)
118	Ivan Gorjup	Koloy's	6(6)	1980-11-30	West Germany			
119	Zvonko Rasic	Zagreb	1(1)	1980-11-30	West Germany			
120	Zlatko Butorac	Zagreb	3(3)	1980-11-30	West Germany			
121	LJubo Rezar	Koloy's	5(6)	1981-04-25	Morocco			
122	Goran Keric	Dinamo	3(3)	1981-04-25	Morocco			
123	Velimir Juras	Energoinvest	4(13)	1981-04-25	Morocco			(4)
124	Pero Babic	Nada	4(6)	1981-11-27	Switzerland			
125	Mirko Lovric	Rudar	1			1982-04-09	London Scottish RFC U23	
126	Dusan Cadjo	Celik	3(4)	1982-05-08	Sweden	1982-04-09	London Scottish RFC U23	
127	Nasir Vehabovic	Celik	22(45)	1982-05-08	Sweden	1982-04-09	London Scottish RFC U23	28(151)
128	Zlatko Milinkovic	Celik	2(3)	1982-05-08	Sweden	1982-04-09	London Scottish RFC U23	(4)
129	Miro Spiric	Zagreb	1			1982-04-09	London Scottish RFC U23	3
130	Jasmin Deljkic	Celik	18(40)	1982-05-15	Denmark	1982-04-09	London Scottish RFC U23	4(8)
131	Boro Karaman	Celik	4(8)	1984-05-05	Tunisia	1982-04-09	London Scottish RFC U23	
132	Stanko LJesic	Celik	1(2)	1982-05-08	Sweden	1982-04-09	London Scottish RFC U23	
133	Ziga Dobnikar	Koloy's	6(6)	1982-05-08	Sweden			16(16)
134	Predrag Grbic	Celik	2(4)	1982-05-08	Sweden			
135	Zoran Buzov	Nada	9(21)	1982-05-15	Denmark			
136	Dervis Ajanovic	Celik	8(17)	1982-05-15	Denmark			4(28)
137	Dragan Arsenic	Celik	6(8)	1982-09-18	Tunisia			4(4)
138	Tomislav Hren	Zagreb	3(5)	1982-09-18	Tunisia			4
139	Boris Radisavljevic	Koloy's	1(2)	1982-11-14	Czechoslovakia			(4)
140	Zeljko Kuharic	Mladost	1(1)	1982-11-27	Switzerland			
141	Aleksandar Mitrovic	Koloy's	2(2)	1983-04-30	Belgium			
142	Stjepan Majcen	Celik	1(9)	1983-05-14	Tunisia			
143	Aleksandar Hebar	BRK	4(10)	1983-11-05	Czechoslovakia	1983-10-15	Beograd	4(19)
144	Dragomir Puric	Celik	1(4)	1990-05-13	Luxembourg	1983-10-15	Beograd	
145	Josko DJuderija	Nada	2(2)	1983-11-05	Czechoslovakia			
146	Davor Mrkic	Zagreb	3(10)	1983-11-13	West Germany			
147	Mirko Curkovic	Nada	8(22)	1983-11-13	West Germany			(48)
148	Petar Lerotic	Nada	4(7)	1983-11-13	West Germany			
149	Marjan Pilko	Koloy's	2(4)	1984-05-05	Tunisia			
150	Jure Mahkota	Koloy's	2(4)	1984-05-05	Tunisia			4(4)

== 150 to 200 ==
Plavi No.	Name	Club	Tests (Total Games)	Test Debut	Opposition	Debut	Opposition	Test Points (Total Points)
151	Ibrahim Hasagic	Celik	7(14)	1984-05-05	Tunisia			13(30)
152	Marjan Petrusic	Nada	2(4)	1984-05-05	Tunisia			
153	Nikola Sutic	Nada	3(5)	1984-05-05	Tunisia			4(4)
154	Aleksandar Maljkovic	Partizan	1			1984-05-15	Middlesex	
155	Bozidar Pavelic	Sinj	1(9)	1987-11-29	West Germany	1984-05-15	Middlesex	
156	Muris Uzunovic	Celik	3(9)	1990-05-13	Luxembourg	1984-05-15	Middlesex	
157	Tone Troppan	Koloy's	1(2)	1986-11-16	Switzerland	1984-05-15	Middlesex	
158	Mirsad Kapic	Celik	2			1984-10-20	Beograd	
159	Dragan Tubin	Celik	1(5)	1990-05-26	Andorra	1984-10-20	Beograd	
160	Armin Zeric	Sisak	1(3)	1986-11-1986	Switzerland	1984-10-20	Beograd	
161	Pero Barisic	Celik	5(10)	1985-12-07	Switzerland	1984-10-20	Beograd	8(28)
162	Muhidin Lagumdzija	Celik	3			1984-10-20	Beograd	
163	Mirsad Zeric	Sisak	2			1984-10-20	Beograd	(4)
164	Drazen Majcen	Celik	9(18)	1985-12-07	Switzerland	1984-10-20	Beograd	6(33)
165	Radenko Pirgic	Celik	1(4)	1986-11-16	Switzerland	1985-10-19	Beograd	
166	Milan Maksimovic	Sisak	3			1985-10-19	Beograd	
167	Sinisa Lusic	Nada	1(4)	1985-12-07	Switzerland	1985-10-19	Beograd	
168	Besko Bosnic	Sisak	1(4)	1985-12-07	Switzerland	1985-10-19	Beograd	(4)
169	Goran Slavulj	Sisak	4(7)	1986-11-16	Switzerland			
170	Vladimir Cirkovic	BRK	1(1)	1986-11-16	Switzerland			
171	Marinko Klaric Kukuz	Sinj	8(20)	1986-11-16	Switzerland			8(36)
172	Dusan Jerotijevic	Partizan	4(13)					
173	Zoran Pecnjak	Nada	3					
174	Radovan Grujicic	Partizan	1(3)	1989-09-09	Czechoslovakia			
175	Enver Imamovic	Celik	1(3)	1987-11-29	West Germany			
176	Renato Jukic	Nada	6(18)	1987-11-29	West Germany			(20)
177	Pavle Grubisic	Nada	5(14)					34(128)
178	Dzoni Mandic	Partizan	7(16)	1987-11-29	West Germany			(12)
179	Predrag Zivaljevic	Energoinvest	2(11)	1989-09-09	Czechoslovakia	1988-03-13	Dalmacija XV	
180	Zan Garic	Partizan	6(19)	1988-04-14	Belgium	1988-03-13	Dalmacija XV	
181	Franc Slavec	Bezigrad	5			1988-03-13	Dalmacija XV	(4)
182	Ines Grozdanic	Energoinvest	1			1988-03-13	Dalmacija XV	
183	Aleksandar Duzdevic	Partizan	4(16)	1988-05-08	Portugal	1988-03-13	Dalmacija XV	(60)
184	Dejan Josimov	Dinamo	4(20)	1988-04-14	Belgium	1988-03-13	Dalmacija XV	(21)
185	Dragan Grujic	Partizan	12(33)	1988-04-14	Belgium	1988-03-13	Dalmacija XV	8(44)
186	Andrej Cevka	Bezigrad	2			1988-03-13	Dalmacija XV	(4)
187	Nikola Scepanovic	Nada	5(20)	1988-05-08	Portugal	1988-03-13	Dalmacija XV	4(4)
188	Milos Cukanovic	Dinamo	1			1988-03-13	Dalmacija XV	
189	Dusan Mrvos	Dinamo	10			1988-03-20	Srbija	
190	Damir Dimitrijevic	Partizan	11(34)	1988-04-14	Belgium	1988-04-02	Becket Hause RFC	(8)
191	Ivica Buzov	Nada	1			1988-04-02	Sinj	(8)
192	Jovo Karisik	C.O.C	2(2)	1988-04-14	Belgium			
193	Dejan Petrovic	Partizan	1(2)	1990-11-11	Bulgaria	1988-05-20	Surrey County Clubs	
194	Ivica Pavic	Sinj	1			1988-05-20	Surrey County Clubs	
195	Milan Medic	Partizan	1			1988-05-20	Surrey County Clubs	(6)
196	Branislav Gajevic	Partizan	1			1988-05-20	Surrey County Clubs	
197	Dragan Radlovic	Partizan	1			1988-05-20	Surrey County Clubs	
198	Josip Kelava	Zagreb	3(11)	1988-11-12	Belgium	1988-09-10	Nada II	
199	Pero Prebeg	Zagreb	8(22)	1988-11-12	Belgium	1988-09-10	Nada II	4(44)
200	Aleksandar Kostic	BRK	1(3)	1991-04-21	Czechoslovakia	1988-09-10	Nada II	(10)

== 201 to 226 ==
Plavi No.	Name	Club	Tests (Total Games)	Test Debut	Opposition	Debut	Opposition	Test Points (Total Points)
201	Dejan Stiglic	BRK	2			1988-09-10	Nada II	
202	Nenad Tomic-Feric	Nada	3(9)	1988-11-12	Belgium	1988-10-01	Nada II	(6)
203	Darin Nozina	Nada	2(13)	1988-11-20	West Germany	1988-10-01	Nada	
204	Roko Sutic	Nada	1(5)	1989-04-22	Portugal	1989-03-26	Calder Vale RFC	
205	Bozidar Jelic	BRK	3			1989-03-26	Calder Vale RFC	
206	Josko Babic	Energoinvest	2			1989-05-18	Old Emanuel RFC	
207	Davor Curic	Mladost	1(3)	1989-09-09	Czechoslovakia	1989-06-03	ARK Mladost	4
208	Predrag Filipovic	Lokomotiva	1			1989-06-03	ARK Mladost	
209	Srdjan Erdeljan	Dinamo	1			1989-06-03	ARK Mladost	(4)
210	Andjelo Mojsovic	Nada	1(2)	1989-09-09	Czechoslovakia			
211	Miodrag Malovic	Celik	2(4)	1990-05-13	Luxembourg	1990-05-06	France Universitaire	
212	Hrvoje Bartolic	Zagreb	2			1990-05-06	France Universitaire	
213	Igor Manojlovic	BRK	3			1990-05-06	France Universitaire	
214	Goran Jurisic	Celik	1(3)	1991-04-21	Czechoslovakia	1990-05-08	Selection Bourgogne	
215	Igor Tunukovic	Zagreb	2			1990-05-08	Selection Bourgogne	
216	Nenad Semenov	Zagreb	2(4)	1990-05-08	Andorra	1990-05-08	Selection Bourgogne	
217	Sandi Stupar	Koloy's	1(2)	1990-11-11	Bulgaria	1990-10-14	NZ YUG Sport Club	
218	Bora Nedeljkovic	Partizan	2(3)	1990-11-11	Bulgaria	1990-10-14	NZ YUG Sport Club	
219	Jasmin Rebselj	Koloy's	1(2)	1990-11-11	Bulgaria	1990-10-14	NZ YUG Sport Club	
220	Jasmin Suljic	Koloy's	1			1990-10-14	NZ YUG Sport Club	
221	Zlatko Sadzakovic	Partizan	1(2)	1990-11-11	Bulgaria	1990-10-14	NZ YUG Sport Club	
222	Elvir Hamulic	Partizan	2(3)	1990-11-11	Bulgaria	1990-10-14	NZ YUG Sport Club	4(4)
223	Tihomir Jankovic	Zagreb	1			1990-10-14	NZ YUG Sport Club	
224	Ales Oblak	Koloy's	1(1)	1990-11-11	Bulgaria			
225	Safet Cerim	Celik	1(1)	1991-04-21	Czechoslovakia			
226	Aleksandar Jakisic	Partizan	1(1)	1991-04-21	Czechoslovakia			

== Bibliography ==
- Proslo je 30 godina, anniversary book, 1985, published by SFR Yugoslavia Rugby Union
- 20 godina Ragbi kluba Zagreb, 1984, published by RK Zagreb
- 10 godina ragbija na Makarskoj rivijeri 1968–1978, published by RK Energoinvest Makarska
- 50 godina Ragbi kluba Nada 1959–2009, published by RK Nada Split
