= Black carbon =

Component of fine particulate matter

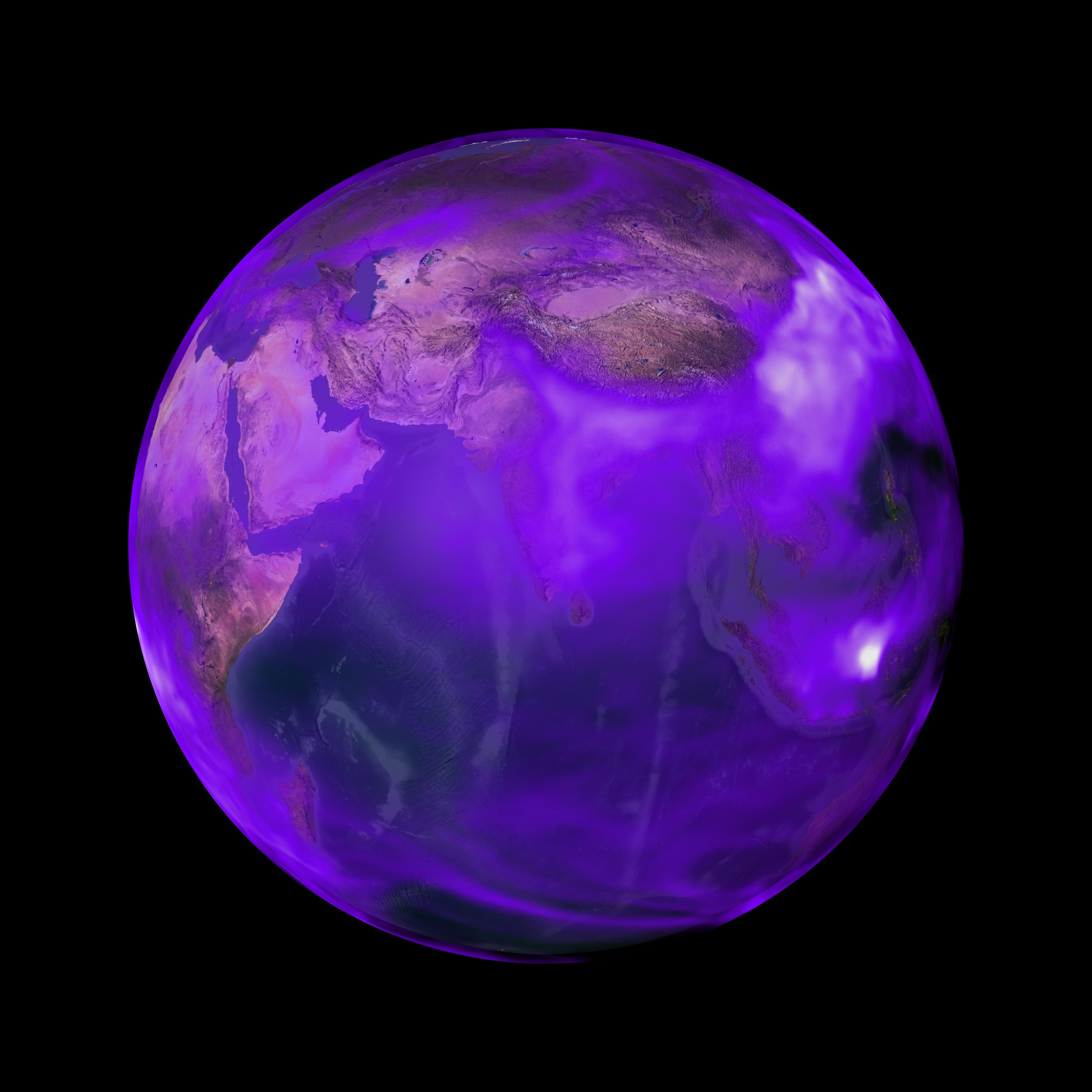
Black carbon is found worldwide, but its presence and impact are particularly strong in Asia.

Black carbon is in the air and circulates the globe.

Black carbon travels along wind currents from Asian cities and accumulates over the Tibetan Plateau and Himalayan foothills.

Black carbon (BC) is the light-absorbing refractory form of elemental carbon remaining after pyrolysis (e.g., charcoal) or produced by incomplete combustion (e.g. soot).

Tihomir Novakov originated the term black carbon in the 1970s, after identifying black carbon as fine particulate matter (PM ≤ 2.5 μm aerodynamic diameter) in aerosols. Aerosol black carbon occurs in several linked forms. Formed through the incomplete combustion of fossil fuels, biofuel, and biomass, black carbon is one of the main types of soot particle in both anthropogenic and naturally occurring soot. As soot, black carbon causes disease and premature death. Because of these human health impacts, many countries have worked to reduce their emissions.

In climatology, aerosol black carbon is a climate forcing agent contributing to global warming. Black carbon warms the Earth by absorbing sunlight and heating the atmosphere and by reducing albedo when deposited on snow and ice (direct effects) and indirectly by interaction with clouds, with the total forcing of 1.1 W/m^{2}. Black carbon stays in the atmosphere for only several days to weeks. In contrast, potent greenhouse gases have longer lifecycles. For example, carbon dioxide (CO_{2}) has an atmospheric lifetime of more than 100 years. The IPCC and other climate researchers have posited that reducing black carbon is one of the easiest ways to slow down short term global warming.

The term black carbon is also used in soil science and geology, referring to deposited atmospheric black carbon or directly incorporated black carbon from vegetation fires. Especially in the tropics, black carbon in soils significantly contributes to fertility as it can absorb important plant nutrients.

In climatology, biochar carbon removal sequesters atmospheric carbon as black carbon to slow global warming.

== Overview ==
Michael Faraday recognized that soot was composed of carbon and that it was produced by the incomplete combustion of carbon-containing fuels. The term black carbon was coined by Serbian physicist Tihomir Novakov, referred to as "the godfather of black carbon studies" by James Hansen, in the 1970s. Smoke or soot was the first pollutant to be recognized as having significant environmental impact yet one of the last to be studied by the contemporary atmospheric research community.

Soot is composed of a complex mixture of organic compounds which are weakly absorbing in the visible spectral region and a highly absorbing black component which is variously called "elemental", "graphitic" or "black carbon". The term elemental carbon has been used in conjunction with thermal and wet chemical determinations and the term graphitic carbon suggests the presence of graphite-like micro-crystalline structures in soot as evidenced by Raman spectroscopy. The term black carbon is used to imply that this soot component is primarily responsible for the absorption of visible light. The term black carbon is sometimes used as a synonym for both the elemental and graphitic component of soot. It can be measured using different types of devices based on absorption or dispersion of a light beam or derived from noise measurements.

=== Early mitigation attempts ===
The disastrous effects of coal pollution on human health and mortality in the early 1950s in London led to the UK Clean Air Act 1956. This act led to dramatic reductions of soot concentrations in the United Kingdom which were followed by similar reductions in US cities like Pittsburgh and St. Louis. These reductions were largely achieved by the decreased use of soft coal for domestic heating by switching either to "smokeless" coals or other forms of fuel, such as fuel oil and natural gas. The steady reduction of smoke pollution in the industrial cities of Europe and United States caused a shift in research emphasis away from soot emissions and the almost complete neglect of black carbon as a significant aerosol constituent, at least in the United States.

In the 1970s, however, a series of studies substantially changed this picture and demonstrated that black carbon as well as the organic soot components continued to be a large component in urban aerosols across the United States and Europe which led to improved controls of these emissions. In the less-developed regions of the world where there were limited or no controls on soot emissions the air quality continued to degrade as the population increased. It was not generally realized until many years later that from the perspective of global effects the emissions from these regions were extremely important.

=== Influence on Earth's atmosphere ===
Most of the developments mentioned above relate to air quality in urban atmospheres. The first indications of the role of black carbon in a larger, global context came from studies of the Arctic Haze phenomena. Black carbon was identified in the Arctic haze aerosols and in the Arctic snow.

In general, aerosol particles can affect the radiation balance leading to a cooling or heating effect with the magnitude and sign of the temperature change largely dependent on aerosol optical properties, aerosol concentrations, and the albedo of the underlying surface. A purely scattering aerosol will reflect energy that would normally be absorbed by the earth-atmosphere system back to space and leads to a cooling effect. As one adds an absorbing component to the aerosol, it can lead to a heating of the earth-atmosphere system if the reflectivity of the underlying surface is sufficiently high.

Early studies of the effects of aerosols on atmospheric radiative transfer on a global scale assumed a dominantly scattering aerosol with only a small absorbing component, since this appears to be a good representation of naturally occurring aerosols. However, as discussed above, urban aerosols have a large black carbon component and if these particles can be transported on a global scale then one would expect a heating effect over surfaces with a high surface albedo like snow or ice. Furthermore, if these particles are deposited in the snow an additional heating effect would occur due to reductions in the surface albedo.

=== Measuring and modeling spatial distribution ===
Levels of black carbon are most often determined based on the modification of the optical properties of a fiber filter by deposited particles. Either filter transmittance, filter reflectance or a combination of transmittance and reflectance is measured. Aethalometers are frequently used devices that optically detect the changing absorption of light transmitted through a filter ticket. The USEPA Environmental Technology Verification program evaluated both the aethalometer and also the Sunset Laboratory thermal-optical analyzer. A multiangle absorption photometer takes into account both transmitted and reflected light. Alternative methods rely on satellite based measurements of optical depth for large areas or more recently on spectral noise analysis for very local concentrations.

In the late 1970s and early 1980s surprisingly large ground level concentrations of black carbon were observed throughout the western Arctic. Modeling studies indicated that they could lead to heating over polar ice. One of the major uncertainties in modeling the effects of the Arctic haze on the solar radiation balance was limited knowledge of the vertical distributions of black carbon.

During 1983 and 1984 as part of the NOAA AGASP program, the first measurements of such distributions in the Arctic atmosphere were obtained with an aethalometer which had the capability of measuring black carbon on a real-time basis. These measurements showed substantial concentrations of black carbon found throughout the western Arctic troposphere including the North Pole. The vertical profiles showed either a strongly layered structure or an almost uniform distribution up to eight kilometers with concentrations within layers as large as those found at ground level in typical mid-latitude urban areas in the United States. The absorption optical depths associated with these vertical profiles were large as evidenced by a vertical profile over the Norwegian arctic where absorption optical depths of 0.023 to 0.052 were calculated respectively for external and internal mixtures of black carbon with the other aerosol components.

Optical depths of these magnitudes lead to a substantial change in the solar radiation balance over the highly reflecting Arctic snow surface during the March–April time frame of these measurements modeled the Arctic aerosol for an absorption optical depth of 0.021 (which is close to the average of an internal and external mixtures for the AGASP flights), under cloud-free conditions. These heating effects were viewed at the time as potentially one of the major causes of Arctic warming trends as described in Archives of Dept. of Energy, Basic Energy Sciences Accomplishments.

=== Presence in soils ===
Typically, black carbon accounts for 1 to 6%, and up to 60% of the total organic carbon stored in soils is contributed by black carbon. Especially for tropical soils black carbon serves as a reservoir for nutrients. Experiments showed that soils without high amounts of black carbon are significantly less fertile than soils that contain black carbon. An example of this increased soil fertility is the Terra preta soils of central Amazonia, presumably human-made by pre-Columbian native populations. Terra preta soils have, on average, three times higher soil organic matter (SOM) content, higher nutrient levels, and a better nutrient retention capacity than surrounding infertile soils. In this context, the slash and burn agricultural practice used in tropical regions does not only enhance productivity by releasing nutrients from the burned vegetation but also by adding black carbon to the soil. Nonetheless, for sustainable management, a slash-and-char practice would be better to prevent high emissions of CO_{2} and volatile black carbon. Furthermore, the positive effects of this type of agriculture are counteracted if used for large patches so that the vegetation does not prevent soil erosion.

=== Presence in waters ===
Soluble and colloidal black carbon retained on the landscape from wildfires can make its way to groundwater. On a global scale, the flow of black carbon into fresh and salt water bodies approximates the rate of wildfire black carbon production.

== Emission sources ==
=== By region ===
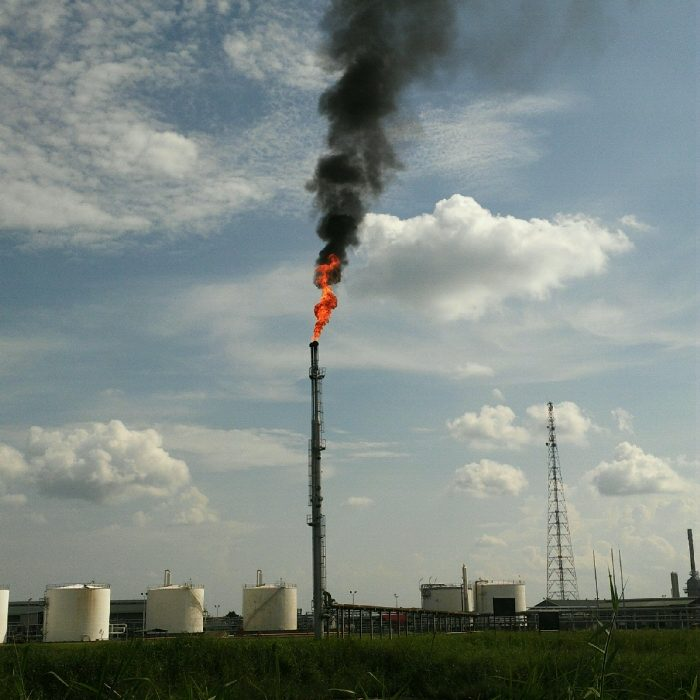
Inefficient gas flare that creates black carbon at a site in Indonesia

Developed countries were once the primary source of black carbon emissions, but this began to change in the 1950s with the adoption of pollution control technologies in those countries. Whereas the United States emits about 21% of the world's CO_{2}, it emits 6.1% of the world's soot. The European Union and United States might further reduce their black carbon emissions by accelerating implementation of black carbon regulations that currently take effect in 2015 or 2020 and by supporting the adoption of pending International Maritime Organization (IMO) regulations. Existing regulations also could be expanded to increase the use of clean diesel and clean coal technologies and to develop second-generation technologies.

Today, the majority of black carbon emissions are from developing countries and this trend is expected to increase. The largest sources of black carbon are Asia, Latin America, and Africa. China and India together account for 25–35% of global black carbon emissions. Black carbon emissions from China doubled from 2000 to 2006. Existing and well-tested technologies used by developed countries, such as clean diesel and clean coal, could be transferred to developing countries to reduce their emissions.

Black carbon emissions are highest in and around major source regions. This results in regional hotspots of atmospheric solar heating due to black carbon. Hotspot areas include:

- the Indo-Gangetic plains of India
- eastern China
- most of Southeast Asia and Indonesia
- equatorial regions of Africa
- Mexico and Central America
- most of Brazil and Peru in South America.

Approximately three billion people live in these hotspots.

=== By source ===
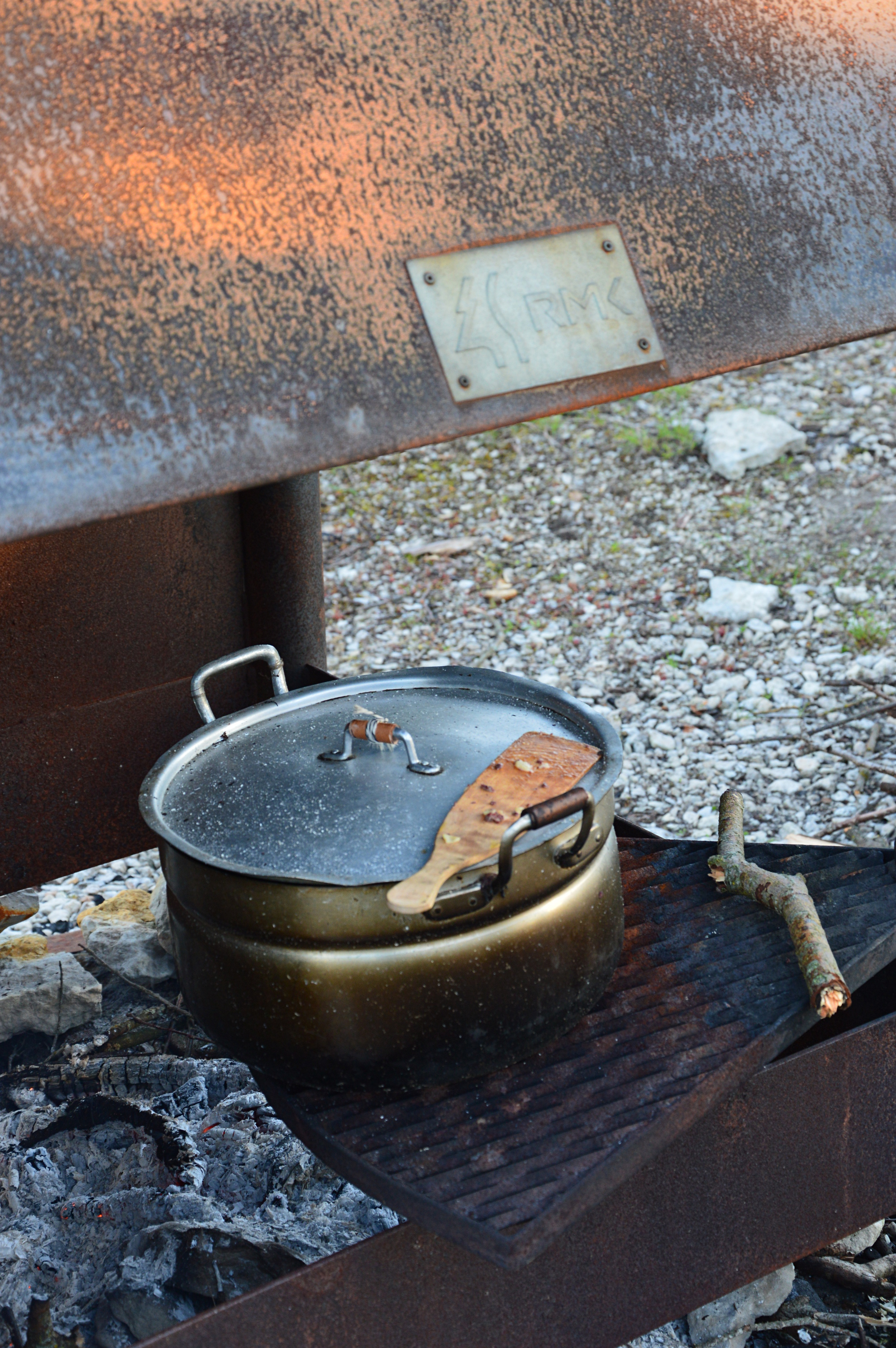
Black carbon on a cooking pot. Result of a biofuel cooking.

Approximately 20% of black carbon is emitted from burning biofuels, 40% from fossil fuels, and 40% from open biomass burning. Similar estimates of the sources of black carbon emissions are as follows:

- 42% Open biomass burning. (forest and savanna burning)
- 18% Residential biomass burned with traditional technologies.
- 14% Diesel engines for transportation.
- 10% Diesel engines for industrial use.
- 10% Industrial processes and power generation, usually from smaller boilers.
- 6% Residential coal burned with traditional technologies.

Black carbon sources vary by region. For example, the majority of soot emissions in South Asia are due to biomass cooking, whereas in East Asia, coal combustion for residential and industrial uses plays a larger role. In Western Europe, traffic seems to be the most important source since high concentrations coincide with proximity to major roads or participation to (motorized) traffic.

Fossil fuel and biomass soot have significantly greater amounts of black carbon than climate-cooling aerosols and particulate matter, making reductions of these sources particularly powerful mitigation strategies. For example, emissions from the diesel engines and marine vessels contain higher levels of black carbon compared to other sources. Regulating black carbon emissions from diesel engines and marine vessels therefore presents a significant opportunity to reduce black carbon's global warming impact.

Biomass burning emits greater amounts of climate-cooling aerosols and particulate matter than black carbon, resulting in short-term cooling. However, over the long-term, biomass burning may cause a net warming when CO_{2} emissions and deforestation are considered. Reducing biomass emissions would therefore reduce global warming in the long-term and provide co-benefits of reduced air pollution, CO_{2} emissions, and deforestation. It has been estimated that by switching to slash-and-char from slash-and-burn agriculture, which turns biomass into ash using open fires that release black carbon and GHGs, 12% of anthropogenic carbon emissions caused by land use change could be reduced annually, which is approximately 0.66 Gt CO_{2}-eq. per year, or 2% of all annual global CO_{2}-eq emissions.

In a research study published in June 2022, atmospheric scientist Christopher Maloney and his colleagues noted that rocket launches release tiny particles called aerosols in the stratosphere and increase ozone layer loss. They used a climate model to determine the impact of the black carbon coming out of the rocket's engine nozzle. Using various scenarios of growing number of rocket launches, they found that each year, rocket launches could expel 1–10 gigagrams of black carbon at the lower end to 30–100 gigagrams at the extreme end in next few decades. In another study published in June 2022, researchers used a 3D model to study the impact of rocket launches and reentry. They determined that the black carbon particles emitted by the rockets results in an enhanced warming effect of almost 500 times more than other sources.

== Impacts ==
Black carbon is a form of ultrafine particulate matter, which when released in the air causes premature human mortality and disability. In addition, atmospheric black carbon changes the radiative energy balance of the climate system in a way that raises air and surface temperatures, causing a variety of detrimental environmental impacts on humans, on agriculture, and on plant and animal ecosystems.

=== Public health impacts ===
Particulate matter is the most harmful to public health of all air pollutants in Europe. Black carbon particulate matter contains very fine carcinogens and is therefore particularly harmful.

It is estimated that from 640,000 to 4,900,000 premature human deaths could be prevented every year by using available mitigation measures to reduce black carbon in the atmosphere.

Humans are exposed to black carbon by inhalation of air in the immediate vicinity of local sources. Important indoor sources include candles and biomass burning whereas traffic and occasionally forest fires are the major outdoor sources of black carbon exposure. Concentrations of black carbon decrease sharply with increasing distance from (traffic) sources which makes it an atypical component of particulate matter. This makes it difficult to estimate exposure of populations. For particulate matter, epidemiological studies have traditionally relied on single fixed site measurements or inferred residential concentrations. Recent studies have shown that as much black carbon is inhaled in traffic and at other locations as at the home address.

Despite the fact that a large portion of the exposure occurs as short peaks of high concentrations, it is unclear how to define peaks and determine their frequency and health impact. High peak concentrations are encountered during car driving. High in-vehicle concentrations of black carbon have been associated with driving during rush hours, on highways and in dense traffic.

Even relatively low exposure concentrations of black carbon have a direct effect on the lung function of adults and an inflammatory effect on the respiratory system of children. A recent study found no effect of black carbon on blood pressure when combined with physical activity.

The public health benefits of reduction in the amount of soot and other particulate matter has been recognized for years. However, high concentrations persist in industrializing areas in Asia and in urban areas in the West such as Chicago. The WHO estimates that air pollution causes nearly two million premature deaths per year. By reducing black carbon, a primary component of fine particulate matter, the health risks from air pollution will decline. In fact, public health concerns have given rise to leading to many efforts to reduce such emissions, for example, from diesel vehicles and cooking stoves.

=== Climate impacts ===
Direct effect Black carbon particles directly absorb sunlight and reduce the planetary albedo when suspended in the atmosphere.

Semi-direct effect Black carbon absorb incoming solar radiation, perturb the temperature structure of the atmosphere, and influence cloud cover. They may either increase or decrease cloud cover under different conditions.

Snow/ice albedo effect When deposited on high albedo surfaces like ice and snow, black carbon particles reduce the total surface albedo available to reflect solar energy back into space. Small initial snow albedo reduction may have a large forcing because of a positive feedback: Reduced snow albedo would increase surface temperature. The increased surface temperature would decrease the snow cover and further decrease surface albedo.

Indirect effect Black carbon may also indirectly cause changes in the absorption or reflection of solar radiation through changes in the properties and behavior of clouds. Research scheduled for publication in 2013 shows black carbon plays a role second only to carbon dioxide in climate change. Effects are complex, resulting from a variety of factors, but due to the short life of black carbon in the atmosphere, about a week as compared to carbon dioxide which last centuries, control of black carbon offers possible opportunities for slowing, or even reversing, climate warming.

==== Radiative forcing ====
Estimates of black carbon's globally averaged direct radiative forcing vary from the IPCC's estimate of + 0.34 watts per square meter (W/m^{2}) ± 0.25, to a more recent estimate by V. Ramanathan and G. Carmichael of 0.9 W/m^{2}.

The IPCC also estimated the globally averaged snow albedo effect of black carbon at +0.1 ± 0.1 W/m^{2}.

Based on the IPCC estimate, it would be reasonable to conclude that the combined direct and indirect snow albedo effects for black carbon rank it as the third largest contributor to globally averaged positive radiative forcing since the pre-industrial period. In comparison, the more recent direct radiative forcing estimate by Ramanathan and Carmichael would lead one to conclude that black carbon has contributed the second largest globally averaged radiative forcing after carbon dioxide (CO_{2}), and that the radiative forcing of black carbon is "as much as 55% of the CO_{2} forcing and is larger than the forcing due to the other greenhouse gasses (GHGs) such as CH_{4}, CFCs, N_{2}O, or tropospheric ozone."

Table 1: Estimates of Black Carbon Radiative Forcing, by Effect

Source	Direct Effect	Semi-Direct Effect	Dirty Clouds Effect	Snow/Ice Albedo Effect	Total
IPCC (2007)	0.34 ± 0.25	-	-	0.1 ± 0.1	0.44 ± 0.35
Jacobson (2001, 2004, and 2006)	0.55	-	0.03	0.06	0.64
Hansen (2001, 2002, 2003, 2005, and 2007)	0.2 – 0.6	0.3 ± 0.3	0.1 ± 0.05	0.2 ± 0.1	0.8 ± 0.4 (2001); 1.0 ± 0.5 (2002) »0.7 ± 0.2 (2003); 0.8 (2005)
Hansen & Nazarenko (2004)	-	-	-	~ 0.3 globally 1.0 arctic	-
Ramanathan (2007)	0.9	-	-	0.1 to 0.3	1.0 to 1.2

Table 2: Estimated Climate Forcings (W/m^{2})

Component	IPCC (2007)	Hansen, et al. (2005)
CO_{2}	1.66	1.50
BC	0.05-0.55	0.8
CH_{4}	0.48	0.55
Tropospheric Ozone	0.35	0.40
Halocarbons	0.34	0.30
N_{2}O	0.16	0.15

==== Effects on Arctic ice and Himalayan glaciers ====
According to the IPCC, "the presence of black carbon over highly reflective surfaces, such as snow and ice, or clouds, may cause a significant positive radiative forcing". The IPCC also notes that emissions from biomass burning, which usually have a negative forcing, have a positive forcing over snow fields in areas such as the Himalayas. A 2013 study quantified that gas flares contributed over 40% of the black carbon deposited in the Arctic.

According to Charles Zender, black carbon is a significant contributor to Arctic ice-melt, and reducing such emissions may be "the most efficient way to mitigate Arctic warming that we know of". The "climate forcing due to snow/ice albedo change is of the order of 1.0 W/m^{2} at middle- and high-latitude land areas in the Northern Hemisphere and over the Arctic Ocean." The "soot effect on snow albedo may be responsible for a quarter of observed global warming". "Soot deposition increases surface melt on ice masses, and the meltwater spurs multiple radiative and dynamical feedback processes that accelerate ice disintegration," according to NASA scientists James Hansen and Larissa Nazarenko. As a result of this feedback process, "BC on snow warms the planet about three times more than an equal forcing of CO_{2}." When black carbon concentrations in the Arctic increase during the winter and spring due to Arctic Haze, surface temperatures increase by 0.5 °C. Black carbon emissions also significantly contribute to Arctic ice-melt, which is critical because "nothing in climate is more aptly described as a 'tipping point' than the 0 °C boundary that separates frozen from liquid water—the bright, reflective snow and ice from the dark, heat-absorbing ocean."

Black carbon emissions from northern Eurasia, North America, and Asia have the greatest absolute impact on Arctic warming. However, black carbon emissions actually occurring within the Arctic have a disproportionately larger impact per particle on Arctic warming than emissions originating elsewhere. As Arctic ice melts and shipping activity increases, emissions originating within the Arctic are expected to rise.

In some regions, such as the Himalayas, the impact of black carbon on melting snowpack and glaciers may be equal to that of CO_{2}. Warmer air resulting from the presence of black carbon in South and East Asia over the Himalayas contributes to a warming of approximately 0.6 °C. An "analysis of temperature trends on the Tibetan side of the Himalayas reveals warming in excess of 1 °C." A summer aerosol sampling on a glacier saddle of Mt. Everest (Qomolangma) in 2003 showed industrially induced sulfate from South Asia may cross over the highly elevated Himalaya. This indicated BC in South Asia could also have the same transport mode. And such kind of signal might have been detected in at a black carbon monitoring site in the hinterland of Tibet. Snow sampling and measurement suggested black carbon deposited in some Himalayan glaciers may reduce the surface albedo by 0.01–0.02. Black carbon record based on a shallow ice core drilled from the East Rongbuk glacier showed a dramatic increasing trend of black carbon concentrations in the ice stratigraphy since the 1990s, and simulated average radiative forcing caused by black carbon was nearly 2 W/m^{2} in 2002. This large warming trend is the proposed causal factor for the accelerating retreat of Himalayan glaciers, which threatens fresh water supplies and food security in China and India. A general darkening trend in the mid-Himalaya glaciers revealed by MODIS data since 2000 could be partially attributed to black carbon and light absorbing impurities like dust in the springtime, which was later extended to the whole Hindu Kush-Kararoram-Himalaya glaciers research finding a widespread darkening trend of -0.001 yr^{−1} over the period of 2000–2011. The most rapid decrease in albedo (more negative than -0.0015 yr^{−1}) occurred in the altitudes over 5500 m above sea level.

=== Global warming ===
In its 2007 report, the IPCC estimated for the first time the direct radiative forcing of black carbon from fossil fuel emissions at + 0.2 W/m^{2}, and the radiative forcing of black carbon through its effect on the surface albedo of snow and ice at an additional + 0.1 W/m^{2}. More recent studies and public testimony by many of the same scientists cited in the IPCC's report estimate that emissions from black carbon are the second-largest contributor to global warming after carbon dioxide emissions, and that reducing these emissions may be the fastest strategy for slowing climate change.

Since 1950, many countries have significantly reduced black carbon emissions, especially from fossil fuel sources, primarily to improve public health from improved air quality, and "technology exists for a drastic reduction of fossil fuel related BC" throughout the world.

Given black carbon's relatively short lifespan, reducing black carbon emissions would reduce warming within weeks. Because black carbon remains in the atmosphere only for a few weeks, reducing black carbon emissions may be the fastest means of slowing climate change in the near term. Control of black carbon, particularly from fossil-fuel and biofuel sources, is very likely to be the fastest method of slowing global warming in the immediate future, and major cuts in black carbon emissions could slow the effects of climate change for a decade or two. Reducing black carbon emissions could help keep the climate system from passing the tipping points for abrupt climate changes, including significant sea-level rise from the melting of Greenland and/or Antarctic ice sheets.

"Emissions of black carbon are the second strongest contribution to current global warming, after carbon dioxide emissions". Calculation of black carbon's combined climate forcing at 1.0–1.2 W/m^{2}, which "is as much as 55% of the CO_{2} forcing and is larger than the forcing due to the other [GHGs] such as CH_{4}, CFCs, N_{2}O or tropospheric ozone." Other scientists estimate the total magnitude of black carbon's forcing between + 0.2 and 1.1 W/m^{2} with varying ranges due to uncertainties. (See Table 1.) This compares with the IPCC's climate forcing estimates of 1.66 W/m^{2} for CO_{2} and 0.48 W/m^{2} for CH_{4}. (See Table 2.) In addition, black carbon forcing is two to three times as effective in raising temperatures in the Northern Hemisphere and the Arctic than equivalent forcing values of CO_{2}.

Jacobson calculates that reducing fossil fuel and biofuel soot particles would eliminate about 40% of the net observed global warming. (See Figure 1.) In addition to black carbon, fossil fuel and biofuel soot contain aerosols and particulate matter that cool the planet by reflecting the sun's radiation away from the Earth. When the aerosols and particulate matter are accounted for, fossil fuel and biofuel soot are increasing temperatures by about 0.35 °C.

Black carbon alone is estimated to have a 20-year Global Warming Potential (GWP) of 4,470, and a 100-year GWP of 1,055–2,240. Fossil fuel soot, as a result of mixing with cooling aerosols and particulate matter, has a lower 20-year GWP of 2,530, and a 100-year GWP of 840–1,280.

The Integrated Assessment of Black Carbon and Tropospheric Ozone published in 2011 by the United Nations Environment Programme and World Meteorological Organization calculates that cutting black carbon, along with tropospheric ozone and its precursor, methane, can reduce the rate of global warming by half and the rate of warming in the Arctic by two-thirds, in combination with CO_{2} cuts. By trimming "peak warming", such cuts can keep current global temperature rise below 1.5 ˚C for 30 years and below 2 ˚C for 60 years, in combination with CO_{2} cuts. (FN: UNEP-WMO 2011.) See Table 1, on page 9 of the UNEP-WMO report.

The reduction of CO_{2} as well as SLCFs could keep global temperature rise under 1.5 ˚C through 2030, and below 2 ˚C through 2070, assuming CO_{2} is also cut. See the graph on page 12 of the UNEP-WMO report.

== Control technologies ==
Ramanathan notes that "developed nations have reduced their black carbon emissions from fossil fuel sources by a factor of 5 or more since 1950. Thus, the technology exists for a drastic reduction of fossil fuel related black carbon."

Jacobson believes that "[g]iven proper conditions and incentives, [soot] polluting technologies can be quickly phased out. In some small-scale applications (such as domestic cooking in developing countries), health and convenience will drive such a transition when affordable, reliable alternatives are available. For other sources, such as vehicles or coal boilers, regulatory approaches may be required to nudge either the transition to existing technology or the development of new technology."

Hansen states that "technology is within reach that could greatly reduce soot, restoring snow albedo to near pristine values, while having multiple other benefits for climate, human health, agricultural productivity, and environmental aesthetics. Already soot emissions from coal are decreasing in many regions with transition from small users to power plants with scrubbers."

Jacobson suggests converting "[U.S.] vehicles from fossil fuel to electric, plug-in-hybrid, or hydrogen fuel cell vehicles, where the electricity or hydrogen is produced by a renewable energy source, such as wind, solar, geothermal, hydroelectric, wave, or tidal power. Such a conversion would eliminate 160 Gg/yr (24%) of U.S. (or 1.5% of world) fossil-fuel soot and about 26% of U.S. (or 5.5% of world) carbon dioxide." According to Jacobson's estimates, this proposal would reduce soot and CO_{2} emissions by 1.63 GtCO_{2}–eq. per year. He notes, however, "that the elimination of hydrocarbons and nitrogen oxides would also eliminate some cooling particles, reducing the net benefit by at most, half, but improving human health", a substantial reduction for one policy in one country.

For diesel vehicles in particular there are several effective technologies available. Newer, more efficient diesel particulate filters (DPFs), or traps, can eliminate over 90% of black carbon emissions, but these devices require ultra-low sulfur diesel fuel (ULSD). To ensure compliance with new particulate rules for new on-road and non-road vehicles in the U.S., the EPA first required a nationwide shift to ULSD, which allowed DPFs to be used in diesel vehicles in order to meet the standards. Because of recent EPA regulations, black carbon emissions from diesel vehicles are expected to decline about 70 percent from 2001 to 2020." Overall, "BC emissions in the United States are projected to decline by 42 percent from 2001 to 2020. By the time the full fleet is subject to these rules, EPA estimates that over 239,000 tons of particulate matter will be reduced annually. Outside of the US diesel oxidation catalysts are often available and DPFs will become available as ULSD is more widely commercialized.

Another technology for reducing black carbon emissions from diesel engines is to shift fuels to compressed natural gas. In New Delhi, India, the supreme court ordered shift to compressed natural gas for all public transport vehicles, including buses, taxis, and rickshaws, resulted in a climate benefit, "largely because of the dramatic reduction of black carbon emissions from the diesel bus engines". Overall, the fuel switch for the vehicles reduced black carbon emissions enough to produce a 10 percent net reduction in CO_{2}-eq., and perhaps as much as 30 percent. The main gains were from diesel bus engines whose CO_{2}-eq. emissions were reduced 20 percent. According to a study examining these emissions reductions, "there is a significant potential for emissions reductions through the [UNFCCC] Clean Development for such fuel switching projects."

Technologies are also in development to reduce some of the 133,000 metric tons of particulate matter emitted each year from ships. Ocean vessels use diesel engines, and particulate filters similar to those in use for land vehicles are now being tested on them. As with current particulate filters these too would require the ships to use ULSD, but if comparable emissions reductions are attainable, up to 120,000 metric tons of particulate emissions could be eliminated each year from international shipping. That is, if particulate filters could be shown reduce black carbon emissions 90 percent from ships as they do for land vehicles, 120,000 metric tons of today's 133,000 metric tons of emissions would be prevented. Other efforts can reduce the amount of black carbon emissions from ships simply by decreasing the amount of fuel the ships use. By traveling at slower speeds or by using shore side electricity when at port instead of running the ship's diesel engines for electric power, ships can save fuel and reduce emissions.

Reynolds and Kandlikar estimate that the shift to compressed natural gas for public transport in New Delhi ordered by the Supreme Court reduced climate emissions by 10 to 30%.

Ramanathan estimates that "providing alternative energy-efficient and smoke-free cookers and introducing transferring technology for reducing soot emissions from coal combustion in small industries could have major impacts on the radiative forcing due to soot". Specifically, the impact of replacing biofuel cooking with black carbon-free cookers (solar, bio, and natural gas) in South and East Asia is dramatic: over South Asia, a 70 to 80% reduction in black carbon heating; and in East Asia, a 20 to 40% reduction."

== Biodegradation ==
Condensed aromatic ring structures indicate black carbon degradation in soil. Saprophytic fungi are being researched for their potential role in the degradation of black carbon.

== Policy options ==
Many countries have existing national laws to regulate black carbon emissions, including laws that address particulate emissions. Some examples include:

- banning or regulating slash-and-burn clearing of forests and savannas;
- requiring shore-based power/electrification of ships at port, regulating idling at terminals, and mandating fuel standards for ships seeking to dock at port;
- requiring regular vehicle emissions tests, retirement, or retrofitting (e.g., adding particulate traps), including penalties for failing to meet air quality emissions standards and heightened penalties for on-the-road "super-emitting" vehicles;
- banning or regulating the sale of certain fuels and/or requiring the use of cleaner fuels for certain uses;
- limiting the use of chimneys and other forms of biomass burning in urban and non-urban areas;
- requiring permits to operate industrial, power generating, and oil refining facilities and periodic permit renewal and/or modification of equipment; and
- requiring filtering technology and high-temperature combustion (e.g. supercritical coal) for existing power generation plants and regulating annual emissions from power generation plants.

The International Network for Environmental Compliance & Enforcement issued a Climate Compliance Alert on Black Carbon in 2008, which cited reduction of carbon black as a cost-effective way to reduce a major cause of global warming.

== See also ==
- Nuclear winter
- Asian brown cloud
- Global dimming
- Peat bog
- Environmental impact of the coal industry
- Diesel exhaust
