= Anna Novakov =

Serbian-American art historian (1959)

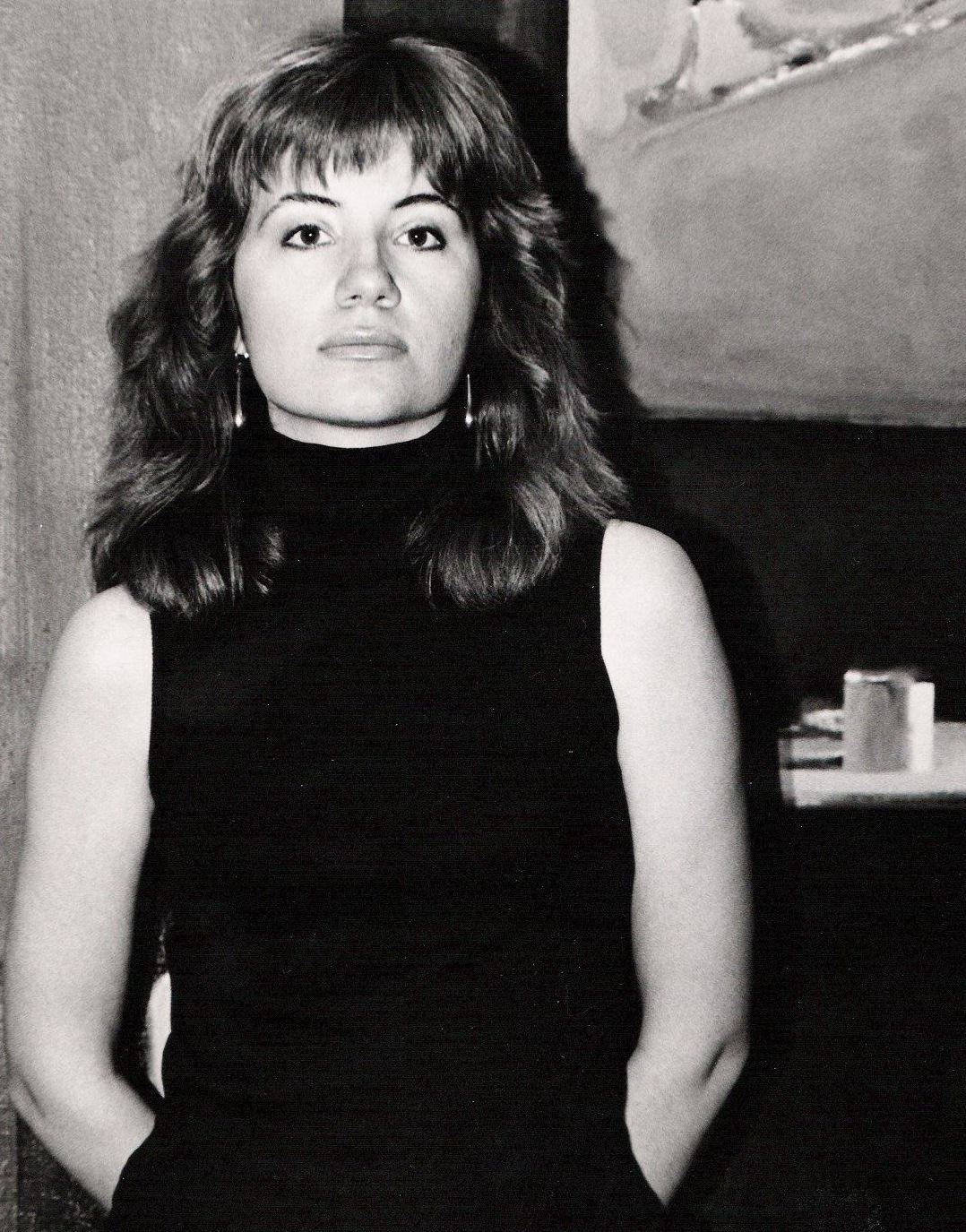
- Born: 2 October 1959 (age 67); Belgrade, PR Serbia, FPR Yugoslavia
- Occupation: Art History
- Awards: Adèle Mellen Prize (2009)

Academic background
- Education: University of California, Berkeley; University of California, Davis; New York University

Anna Novakov is a Serbian-American art historian, critic, educator, and curator based at Saint Mary's College of California. A prolific writer, Novakov has received numerous awards and grants for her research and art criticism. In addition to her published essays, collaborations with artists, museum catalogues and exhibition reviews, she is the primary contributor and editor of more than ten books.

== Education ==
Anna Novakov holds a bachelor's degree from the University of California, Berkeley, a master's degree from the University of California, Davis, and a doctorate from New York University in the History of Art and Art Education under the direction of Professor Angiola Riva Churchill and Professor David Ecker.

== Teaching ==
From 1992 until 2003, Novakov taught courses in the history of art, gender and visual culture at the San Francisco Art Institute. Her students included Nao Bustamante, Felipe Dulzaides, Mads Lynnerup, Matmos, Guy Overfeld, Nuno Pedrosa, Alex Kahn, Kehinde Wiley and many other emerging artists. In 2004 she was tenured as a professor of art history and women's studies at Saint Mary's College of California – a liberal arts college.

As an art historian, Novakov is interested in how art and culture have developed over time. She has also spoken about the role of gender in contemporary public art, and edited books on the subject, including Veiled Histories: The Body, Place and Public Art. Her book (co-authored with Paula Birnbaum), Essays on Women's Artistic and Cultural Contributions, 1919–1939 (2009), was awarded the Adèle Mellen Prize.

== Exhibitions ==
Novakov has been curator of a number of European exhibitions that melded public space and gender with contemporary installation art. Working with Swedish artist, Jorgen Svensson, Novakov conceptualized Public Safety (2000) – an exhibition held in Hammaro, Sweden. In 2005, Novakov collaborated with Swiss artist and writer Denise Ziegler on Moving Target – an international exhibition of public art in Helsinki, Finland.

In 2014, Novakov and artist Ron Hutt founded Provisional Art Spaces. Provisional Art Spaces is an international association of curators and artists who create opportunities for spatial transference through artistic affiliations, environmental action and strategic productions.
