= Sound map =

Digital geographical maps

Sound maps are digital geographical maps that put emphasis on the sonic representation of a specific location. Sound maps are created by associating landmarks (streets in a city, train stations, stores, pathways, factories, oil pumps, etc.) and soundscapes.

The term “soundscape” refers to the sonic environment of a specific locale. It may also refer to actual environments, or to abstract constructions such as musical compositions and tape montages, particularly when considered as an artificial environment. The objective of sound maps is to represent a specific environment using its soundscape as primary references as opposed to visual cues. Sound maps are in many ways the most effective auditory archive of an environment. Sound maps are similar to sound walks which are a form of active participation in the soundscape. Soundwalks and indeed, sound maps encourage the participants to listen discriminatively, and moreover, to make critical judgments about the sounds heard and their contribution to the balance or imbalance of the sonic environment. However, soundwalks will plot out a route for the user to follow and give guidance as to what the user may be hearing at each checkpoint. Sound maps, on the other hand, have specific soundscapes recorded that users can listen to at each checkpoint.

== History / Background ==
The theoretical framework upon which sound maps are based derive from earlier research on acoustic ecology and soundscapes, the later being a term first coined by researcher and music composer R. Murray Schafer in the 1960s. Looking to challenge traditional ideas of recording reality, Schafer, along with several college music composers such as Barry Truax and Hildegard Westerkamp, funded the World Soundscape Project, an ambitious sound recording project that led the team based in Simon Fraser University to travel within Canada and out in Europe to collect data on local soundscapes. The sounds that they recorded were used to build a database of locales not based on the visual, but on their acoustic particularities. The result of the project had been released to the public in the form of a series of books entitled The Music of the Environment series which included narrative accounts of the soundscape recording activity (European Sound Diary) and soundscape analysis (Five Village Soundscapes). However, when those works were first published, the recordings were not available for the public to listen to as the project mainly aimed at building a database of sound over a long period of time. The World Soundscape Project also birthed a major theoretical framework for future studies of acoustic ecology and soundscapes, among them R. Murray Schafer’s The Tuning of the World in which the idea of soundscape studies was first introduced as well as Barry Truax’s The World Soundscape Project's Handbook for Acoustic Ecology that presented the foundational terminology for research in the field.

Sound maps make use of new computer locative technologies to achieve the similar purpose of preserving the soundscape of specific locales, but differs in the way of presenting the sound database. Through digital technologies such as mapping software and audio file encoding, the objective of using sound maps is partly that of making a soundscape database available to the public in a comprehensive fashion by uploading each site-specific soundscape onto a digital map as well as making the end product available for public collaboration. Users are able to pull up a map of the city and click on the sound clip icons in order to hear the soundscape for that location. Some sound maps are crowd-sourced and therefore allow the public to record their own soundscapes and upload them onto the digital map provided by the site hosting the sound map. Therefore, the soundscape database is built by the public and made available to the public for use.

== Applications ==
=== The Sound Around You Project ===
The Sound Around You Project began as a soundscape research project at the University of Salford, UK in 2007. The project allows people to use audio recorders to record clips or sonic postcards of around 30 seconds in length from different sound environments, or ‘soundscapes’ from a family car journey to a busy shopping centre, and to upload them to the virtual map, along with their opinions of them and why they chose to record it. Sound Around You aims to raise awareness of how soundscape influences people.

=== New York Sound Map ===
New York Sound Map (NYSoundmp) is a project of The New York Society for Acoustic Ecology (NYSAE), a New York metropolitan chapter of the American Society for Acoustic Ecology, an organization dedicated to exploring the role of sound in natural habitats and human societies, and promoting public dialog concerning the identification, preservation, and restoration of natural and cultural sound environments. The NYSAE's purpose is to explore and create an ongoing dialog regarding aural experience specific to New York City. The NYSoundmap project is the direct result of the NYSAE's interest in collecting and disseminating the city's aural experiences to the general public. Through the NYSoundmap project, the NYSAE aims to facilitate a dialogue between people from a wide variety of communities and backgrounds - from beginners to professional sound artists and musicians.

=== Stanley Park Soundmap ===
The Stanley Park Soundmap is a web-based document of the sonic attributes of one of North America's largest urban parks located in Vancouver, British Columbia, Canada. Using a GPS unit, and a compact digital audio recorder 13 positions in the park were documented on Thursday, March 12, 2009. The location data and sound recordings were then linked to a map created in a Geographic Information Systems (GIS) based desktop application.

=== Montréal Sound Map ===
Montréal Sound Map is a web-based soundscape project that allows users to upload field recordings to a Google Map of Montréal. The soundscape is fluid, and the project is meant to act as "a sonic time capsule with the goal of preserving sounds before they disappear".

=== Sonoteca Bahia Blanca ===
Sonoteca Bahia Blanca is a virtual platform that aims to provide a common space for the collection, concentration, sharing and distribution of sound through its georeferencing and organization in a database, from a collaborative, supportive cultural practice and community status. The project seeks to enhance the sound heritage of the city.

=== Cities and Memory ===
Cities and Memory is a collaborative sound art and field recording project which centres around a global sound map covering more than 120 countries and territories with every location featuring a field recording but also a reimagined composition based on that recording. The map features more than 6,000 sounds and 1,600 contributing artists.

=== WAVINCITY ===
WAVINCITY is a Hong Kong–based urban soundscape recording project established in 2021 that features a geolocated sound map documenting the city’s sonic environments. The project presents field recordings from various locations across Hong Kong, focusing on everyday urban sounds and changing acoustic environments. WAVINCITY functions as a sound archive and documentation platform, contributing to the preservation and study of Hong Kong’s urban sound heritage.

== See also ==
- Soundscape
- Ambient music
- Biomusic
- Biophony
- Field recording
- Noise map
- Sound art
- Sound sculpture
- Space music
- Soundwalk
- R. Murray Schafer

== Sound file ==
1. Wind Portlandreginal(2011) by Scott Smallwood
  A collection of field recordings from the 2011 Burning Man Festival, Rites of Passage, Black Rock City, NV. August, 2011.
2. Artcar(2011) by Scott Smallwood
