= David Monacchi =

Italian sound artist, researcher, and eco-acoustic composer

David Monacchi is an Italian sound artist, researcher and eco-acoustic composer, best known for his multidisciplinary project Fragments of Extinction, patented periphonic device, the Eco-Acoustic Theatre, and award-winning music and sound-art installations.

Monacchi is internationally recognized for his pioneering work with nonprofit organizations, such as Greenpeace, the World Wildlife Foundation (WWF), and Ear to the Earth, to capture and preserve the unique sonic heritage of the world’s rapidly vanishing, last remaining areas of undisturbed primary equatorial rainforest; his many thousands of hours of field work dedicated to the creation and development of a growing sound bank of these remote ecosystems, which provides raw data for the scientific analysis and study of the world’s most critically endangered biodiversity hotspots; and for raising public awareness and fostering discourse on the biodiversity crisis through his musical compositions and immersive sound installations.

Monacchi is the creator and builder of the "Sonosphere", a technological amphitheater for deep listening ecosystems and music placed inside Palazzo Mosca, home of the Pesaro Civic Museums, where you can attend video and audio screenings of "Fragments of Extinction" by David Monacchi, and "Raphael in Sonosphere" by Simone Sorini and David Monacchi.

== Fragments of Extinction ==
Over the past 25 years (since 1990), composer David Monacchi has conducted field recordings throughout Europe, Africa, Southeast Asia, North and South America. During a 2002 pilot project in the Brazilian Amazon conducted in collaboration with Greenpeace, Monacchi collected his first high-definition ‘sound portraits’ of an intact tropical ecosystem. With these unique recordings, he composed the eco-acoustic opera Fragments of a Sonic World in Extinction, which toured theatres and contemporary music venues across Europe and the United States.

Now, nearly 15 years later, Monacchi’s Fragments of Extinction is its own independent nonprofit organization, dedicated to conducting field research in the world’s last remaining areas of undisturbed primary equatorial rainforest, and a member of ECSITE (the European Network of Science Museums).

Capturing 3D soundscape recordings of these ecosystems with high-technology, "space-inclusive” and “space-preservative” methods and experimental mic techniques, Monacchi is able to faithfully reproduce these sonic ecosystems over periphonic loud-speaker arrays and to produce evocative eco-acoustic compositions, which bring audiences into intimate contact with the acoustic biodiversity of remote ecosystems.

Fragments of Extinction is currently being developed with the multiple aims of: collecting three-dimensional 24-hour cycles of acoustic biodiversity from the most important rainforest hotspots at the equator; analyzing and studying the field data from an ecological and aesthetic point of view; and disseminating the results in research, educational and art contexts by means of the "Eco-acoustic Theatre," a flexible, periphonic theatre space, designed, engineered, and patented by Monacchi.

== Education, Awards, and Honors ==
The recipient of multiple awards throughout Europe and North America, Monacchi is a member of the international networks Ear to the Earth, the World Forum for Acoustic Ecology, a founding member of the Global Sustainable Soundscape Network, and a board member of the International Society of Ecoacoustics. A Fulbright fellow at UC Berkeley in 2007, he has taught at the University of Macerata since 2000 and is now professor of Electroacoustics at the Conservatorio Statale di Musica "Gioachino Rossini" in Pesaro.

Prior to joining its faculty, Monacchi attended the Conservatorio Statale di Musica "G. Rossini" alongside his contemporary, peer and frequent collaborator, composer Eugenio Giordani, studying electronic music with Walter Branchi, Salvatore Sciarrino, Barry Truax (Simon Fraser University-Vancouver), and David Wessel (University of California, Berkeley).

Honors include the Italian Ministry of Foreign Affairs ‘Erato Farnesina’ fellowship for the World Soundscape Project at SFU (Canada, 1998), and international prizes at the Russolo-Pratella Competition (Italy, 1996), the Locarno Film Festival (Switzerland, 1996), and the Multiple Sound Festival (Netherlands, 1993). His music was also twice recognized at the Bourges International Grand Prix of Electroacoustic Music (France, 2007 and 2008), and at the Premio Giovannini for Innovation (Italy, 2013).

Monacchi is based in Italy, travels for field research, and gives concerts and lectures mostly in Europe and North America.

== Selected discography ==
- Eco-Acoustic Compositions (2008). EMF Media (New York, NY)
- Prima Amazonia (2007). Wild Sanctuary (San Francisco, CA)
- After the Untuned Sky (2007), with Corrado Fantoni. Coclearia (Milan, Italy)
- Paesaggi di Libero Ascolto: Retrospettiva di composizioni Elettroacustiche 1990 – 1995 (2005). Ants Records (Rome, Italy)
- Canto Sospeso (2005), with Ilaria Severo. Domani Musica (Rome, Italy)
- Paesaggi Sonori / Soundscapes (2005). Università degli studi di Macerata (Macerata, Italy)

== See also ==
- Acoustic ecology
- Ambisonics
- Bioacoustics
- Biomusicology
- Biophony
- Holocene extinction (also known as the Sixth Mass Extinction)
- Mixed-order Ambisonics
- Niche hypothesis
- Sound installation
- Soundscape
- Soundscape ecology
- World Soundscape Project
