= Matthew Burtner =

American composer

- Born: 1970 (age 55–56); Naknek, Alaska, U.S.
- Genres: Contemporary classical, Electroacoustic, Ecoacoustics
- Occupations: Composer, Professor
- Instruments: Saxophone, Metasaxophone
- Years active: 1990s–present
- Member of: University of Virginia (Faculty)
- Website: matthewburtner.com

Matthew Burtner (born 1970, Naknek, Alaska) is a contemporary American composer. His most recent work at the University of Virginia includes MICE, the mobile interactive computer ensemble.

== Life and music ==
Born into a fishing family, Burtner heard music in the ice and snow melting as well as other nature sounds. Once into grade school, he began learning the saxophone, playing in jazz bands, school bands and performance groups throughout his young years.

In college, he studied philosophy, composition, saxophone and computer music at St. Johns College, Tulane University (BFA 1993), Iannis Xenakis's UPIC Studios, the Peabody Institute of JHU (MM 1997), and Stanford University's CCRMA (DMA 2002). At Stanford he studied and worked closely with Max Mathews, Jonathan Harvey, Brian Ferneyhough and Jon Berger.

Burtner is currently Eleanor Shea Professor of Music at the University of Virginia where he Co-Directs the Coastal Future Conservatory. He was an Invited Researcher at IRCAM/Centre Pompidou in Paris in 2005, an Artist in Residence at the Cite International des Arts in Paris, as well as Composer-in-Residence at Musikene in San Sebastian, Spain.

There are many works by Burtner, including music and sound art for instrumental ensembles, digital sound and multimedia, as well as pieces that he performs on the Metasax. Excerpts of his music can be heard in the "Listening Room" on his website. They are also available on several published recordings.

== Metasax ==
Burtner created and developed the Metasaxophone in 1999. The Metasax, an acoustic tenor saxophone retrofitted with an onboard computer microprocessor, and an array of sensors that convert performance data into independent continuous control messages for a computer. It is also with a unique microphone system allowing for detailed control of the amplified sound. While maintaining full acoustic functionality, the metasax is a versatile computer controller and an electric instrument.

== Ecoacoustics ==
Musical Ecoacoustics is an approach to embedding environmental systems into musical and performative structures using new technologies. It draws on techniques of sonification, acoustic ecology and soundscape composition (Truax, Westerkamp, Keller and others). The data from nature may be audio information from wind or ocean waves, or it may be some measurable parameter such as temperature, geological change, etc.

Burtner's instrumental and electroacoustic music draws environment into the musical structure, and attempts to decentralize human notions of time and form, searching for more universal, ecology-centered forms.

== Works ==
- Electroacoustic theater and new media opera:
  - "Kuik" (2003–2006) for voices, percussion, computer sound, dance/movement, theater, video and interactive media
  - "Windcombs/Imaq" (2005) for mixed instrumental ensemble, computer sound, video, dance/movement, voices and theater
  - "Ukiuq Tulugaq (Winter Raven)" (1998–2002) for mixed ensemble, computer surround sound, voice, theater, dance/movement, video
- Instrumental compositions:
  - "Pulling in the Light" (2006) for mandolin, Yup'ik drum and mixed ensemble
  - "Windprints" (2005) for Chinese Sheng and mixed ensemble
  - "Prismic Generations" (2004) for struck and bowed pitched instruments, computer sound and video
  - "Broken Drum" (2003) for automobile brake drum and computer
  - "Polyrhythmicana" (2002) for flute, cello, guitar, percussion and 4-channel computer-generated click track
  - "Snowprints" (2001) for flute, cello, piano, snow, and computer sound
  - "Animus/Anima" (2001) for voice, extended resonators and computer sound
  - "Signal Ruins" (2000) for piano, bass drums, noise generators and computer sound
  - "Portals of Distortion" (1999) for nine tenor saxophones
  - "Incantation S4-X" (1998) for saxophone quartet and computer-generated sound
  - "Sikuigvik (the time of ice melting)" (1997) for piano and ensemble
  - "Ricercare" (1991: earliest published composition) for violin scordatura and large bass drum
- Computer music sound art:
  - "Spectral for 0" and "Spectral for 60" (2006) for polyrhythmicon and nWinds
  - "That which is bodiless is reflected in bodies" (2004) for Tibetan bowl and 8-channel computer-generated surround sound
  - "Glass Phase" (1999) for polyrhythmicon
  - "Fern" (1997) for computer-generated sound
  - "Mists" (1995) for computer noise generators and stones
- Metasaxophone compositions:
  - "SXrAtch" (2006)
  - "Endprint" (2004)
  - "S-Morphe-S" (2002)
  - "S-Trance-S" (2001)
  - "Noisegate 67" (1999)
  - "Split Voices" (1998)
  - "Incantation S4" (1997)
