= Soundwalk =

A soundwalk is a walk with a focus on listening to the environment. The term was first used by members of the World Soundscape Project under the leadership of composer R. Murray Schafer in Vancouver in the 1970s. Hildegard Westerkamp, from the same group of artists and founder of the World Forum of Acoustic Ecology, defines soundwalking as "... any excursion whose main purpose is listening to the environment. It is exposing our ears to every sound around us no matter where we are."

Schafer was particularly interested in the implications of the changes in soundscapes in industrial societies in children, and children's relationship to the world through sound. He was a proponent of ear-cleaning (cleaning one's ears cognitively), and he saw soundwalking as an important part of this process of re-engaging our aural senses in finding our place in the world.

Westerkamp used soundwalks to create multiple soundart pieces. "Cricket Voice", "A Walk Through the City", and "Beneath the Forest Floor" are all soundwalk inspired works.

Soundwalking has also been used as artistic medium by visual artists and documentary makers, such as Janet Cardiff. In 2018 the sound artist Francesco Giomi introduced for the first time the term "soundride" as a direct derivation from a soundwalk but driven by bicycle, used to reach more far points, interesting from their sound point of view.

Dr Antonella Radicchi has developed the citizen science led Hush City programme, which combines guided soundwalks with a mobile app developed in 2017 to map and assess quiet areas in urban environments.

== Other Terms ==
Other terms closely related to soundwalking and used by Schafer include:

- Keynote: typically ambient sounds which are not perceived, not because they are inaudible but because they are filtered out cognitively, such as a highway or air-condition hum
- Soundmark: a sonic landmark; a sound which is characteristic of a place
- Sound signal: a foreground sound; e.g. a dog, an alarm clock; messages/meaning is usually carried through sound signals.
- Sound object: the smallest possible recognizable sonic entity (recognizable by its amplitude envelope)
- Acousmatic: a description for sounds whose sources are out of sight or unknown. This also relates to acousmatic music.

== See also ==
- Soundscape ecology
- Acousmatic music
- Sound art
- Shinrin-yoku
