= Sounds Good (film) =

Sounds Good is a 2018 Estonian short film produced and directed by animator Sander Joon. The film uses sound as its main storytelling element, combining animation and sound art to create a distinctive audiovisual experience. It follows a boom operator on a surreal and humorous mission to record the sound of mushrooms growing. Through its layered use of environmental sounds and minimalistic visuals, the film turns a technical sound recording process into a reflection on perception and the act of listening. Its focus on sound over dialogue makes it an important example of Estonia's growing interest in experimental animation that merges artistic expression with film.

== Sander Joon ==
Sander Joon was born in 1990 and is an Estonian animator who studied at Estonian Academy of Arts, a university known for its innovative approach to animation, design, and experimental media. The academy has played a central role in shaping Estonia's animation culture and encourages students to explore conceptual and stylistic experimentation rather than commercial production.

Estonian animation has a long history of independence and artistic depth, developed through studios such as Nukufilm and Joonisfilm since the mid-twentieth century. Directors such as Priit Pärn and Olga Pärn helped shape Estonia's unique animation style, which is known for its use of surreal imagery, irony, and psychological depth. This artistic foundation continues to influence the teaching at the Estonian Academy of Arts, where creative independence and critical thinking are encouraged. Joon's work builds on these traditions through his use of metaphor, subtle humor, and minimal design while bringing in modern sound techniques that connect traditional animation with contemporary experimental film.

Joon's films are often described as surreal, precise, and sound driven. He limits visual complexity and builds his storied around layers of ambient sound rather than dialogue or conventional music. Sounds Good was created as his graduation project and used digital 2D animation with a soundscape built from recordings of natural materials such as mold and mushrooms.These recordings were chosen to highlight the physical and tactile qualities of sounds. The narrative unfolds through rhythm and texture rather than the traditional plot of a story, with small sounds such as the creaking of the boom pole or the soft hum of growth guiding the understanding of the watchers. Joon's later works such as Rehak (2020), and Sierra (2022) continue to develop this approach of minimalism and sensory storytelling.

== Techniques ==
The animation is simple and geometric, using muted colours that draw attention to the characters movements and the quiet emptiness of his surroundings. The minimal design helps viewers focus on the sound, reinforcing the films theme of listening as perception. The humor comes from the contrast between the boom operators seriousness and the silence of his subject. The sound design, made from the recording of natural materials such as wood, shapes the pacing and emotional tone of the film. The interplay between the silence and subtle noise gives the film an organic rhythm, turning ordinary sounds into motion. This restrained approach reflects Estonia's broader design culture, where simplicity and careful detail often guide artistic expression.

== Relation to sound art ==
Sound art is a form of artistic practice that uses sound as the primary creative material rather than a supplement to the visual or music. According to Tate Modern sound art involves art that uses sound both as its medium and as its subject. Joon's short film follows this principal by constructing its entire story around sound and the act of listening. Instead of sound supporting his drawing, the film reverses this relationship, allowing the visuals to give sound a physical presence.

Drawing from acoustic ecology and musique concrète, two key approaches in sound based art, the film invited audiences to listen with intention, using humor and subtlety to reveal the expressive potential of everyday sounds.

Acoustic ecology, developed by Canadian composer R. Murray Schafer in the 1970s, studies how people relate to their sonic environments, and encourages awareness of the natural soundscape. The use of recordings of faint crackling of mold, and the shifting of soil reflects this approach by drawing attention to sounds that usually go unnoticed. Musique Concrète was created in the 1940s by French composer Pierre Schaeffer, and looks at the recording of sound as the raw material for composition instead of traditional instruments. Sounds Good shows this by turning real world noises into both the soundtrack and narrative framework to have the natural sound act as both material and metaphor.

== Acknowledgment ==
After its release it was praised for its originality and conceptual clarity. Creative Review described it as "finding the sonic beauty in the mundane", while Zippy Frames called it "a whimsical reflection on the invisible work of sound". The short was shown as numerous international festivals and recognized for its role in expanding how animation can engage with sound based art. It won best student film at both the Kaboom Animation Festival and the Fredrikstad Animation Festival in 2019. Through the use of its mix of visual restraint, experimental sound design, and humor, Sounds Good continues Estonia's tradition of poetic and philosophical animation while also contributing to broader conversations about how sound art and sensory storytelling can become one.
