= WAVINCITY =

Hong Kong urban soundscape recording project

WAVINCITY – Hong Kong Urban Soundscape Recording Project (traditional Chinese: 香港城市聲音記錄計劃; simplified Chinese: 香港城巿声音纪录计划) is a Hong Kong soundscape recording initiative. It was created in 2021 by the sound engineer Peter Wong Tsz Kin (王梓健) and had 54 field recording by late 2023. Example sounds came from construction, cicadas, and chestnuts getting roasted. Some of the recordings were made in Sheung Shui, Tin Shui Wai, and Yuen Long markets. Other recordings were made at the airport terminal for outbound flights. Sounds included announcements, suitcase wheels making rattline noises, and the swift steps of youngsters. Karen Cheung of New York magazine describe the airport sounds as "quiet and unassuming but melancholic". The recordings in Hong Kong's older districts had more outdoor noise from street vendors while those in newly built areas had noise largely inside at places like shopping malls.
