= Soundscape =

Audible characteristics, resonances of an acoustic environment

A soundscape is the acoustic environment as perceived by humans, in context. The term, originally coined by Michael Southworth, was popularized by R. Murray Schafer. There is a varied history of the use of soundscape depending on discipline, ranging from urban design to wildlife ecology to computer science. An important distinction is to separate soundscape from the broader acoustic environment. The acoustic environment is the combination of all the acoustic resources, natural and artificial, within a given area as modified by the environment. The International Organization for Standardization (ISO) standardized these definitions in 2014. (ISO 12913-1:2014)

A soundscape is a sound or combination of sounds that forms or arises from an immersive environment. The study of soundscape is the subject of acoustic ecology or soundscape ecology. The idea of soundscape refers to both the natural acoustic environment, consisting of natural sounds, including animal vocalizations, the collective habitat expression of which is now referred to as the biophony, and, for instance, the sounds of weather and other natural elements, now referred to as the geophony; and environmental sounds created by humans, the anthropophony. The anthropophony comprises a sub-set called controlled sound, such as musical composition, sound design, and language, work, and sounds of mechanical origin resulting from use of industrial technology. Crucially, the term soundscape also includes the listener's perception of sounds heard as an environment, which Truax describes as "how that environment is understood by those living within it" and therefore mediates their relations. The disruption of these acoustic environments results in noise pollution.

The term "soundscape" can also refer to an audio recording or performance of sounds that create the sensation of experiencing a particular acoustic environment, or compositions created using the found sounds (sounds derived from objects not standardly used for music) of an acoustic environment, either exclusively or in conjunction with musical performances.

Pauline Oliveros, composer of post-World War II electronic art music, defined the term "soundscape" as "All of the waveforms faithfully transmitted to our audio cortex by the ear and its mechanisms".

"Soundscape from Puerto Rico"
Shared by El Cloquido

== Historical context ==
The origin of the term soundscape is somewhat ambiguous. It is often miscredited as having been coined by Canadian composer and naturalist, R. Murray Schafer, who led much of the groundbreaking work on the subject from the 1960s and onwards. According to an interview with Schafer published in 2013, Schafer himself attributes the term to city planner Michael Southworth. Southworth, a former student of Kevin Lynch, led a project in Boston in the 1960s, and reported the findings in a paper entitled "The Sonic Environment of Cities" in 1967, where the term is used.

Around the same time as Southworth's project in Boston, Schafer initiated the World Soundscape Project together with colleagues Barry Truax and Hildegard Westerkamp. Schafer subsequently collected the findings from the world soundscape project and fleshed out the soundscape concept in more detail in his seminal work about the sound environment, "Tuning of the World". Schafer has also used the concept in music education.

== In music ==
In music, soundscape compositions are often a form of electronic music or electroacoustic music. Composers who use soundscapes include real-time granular synthesis pioneer Barry Truax, Hildegard Westerkamp, and Luc Ferrari, whose Presque rien, numéro 1 (1970) is an early soundscape composition. Soundscape composer Petri Kuljuntausta has created soundscape compositions from the sounds of sky dome and Aurora Borealis and deep sea underwater recordings, and a work entitled "Charm of Sound" to be performed at the extreme environment of Saturn's moon Titan. The work landed on the ground of Titan in 2005 after traveling inside the spacecraft Huygens over seven years and four billion kilometers through space.

Irv Teibel's Environments series (1969–79) consisted of 30-minute, uninterrupted environmental soundscapes and synthesized or processed versions of natural sound.

Music soundscapes can also be generated by automated software methods, such as the experimental TAPESTREA application, a framework for sound design and soundscape composition, and others.

The soundscape is often the subject of mimicry in timbre-centered music such as Tuvan throat singing. The process of Timbral Listening is used to interpret the timbre of the soundscape. This timbre is mimicked and reproduced using the voice or rich harmonic producing instruments.

== The environment ==
In Schafer's analysis, there are two distinct soundscapes, "hi-fi" and "lo-fi", created by the environment. A hi-fi system possesses a positive signal-to-noise ratio. These settings make it possible for discrete sounds to be heard clearly since there is no background noise to obstruct even the smallest disturbance. A rural landscape offers more hi-fi frequencies than a city because the natural landscape creates an opportunity to hear incidences from near and afar. In a lo-fi soundscape, signals are obscured by too many sounds, and perspective is lost within the broad-band of noises. In lo-fi soundscapes everything is very close and compact. A person can only listen to immediate encounters; in most cases even ordinary sounds have to be exuberantly amplified in order to be heard.

All sounds are unique in nature. They occur at one time in one place and cannot be replicated. In fact, it is physically impossible for nature to reproduce any phoneme twice in exactly the same manner.

According to Schafer there are three main elements of the soundscape:

- Keynote sounds

This is a musical term that identifies the key of a piece, not always audible ... the key might stray from the original, but it will return. The keynote sounds may not always be heard consciously, but they "outline the character of the people living there" (Schafer). They are created by nature (geography and climate): wind, water, forests, plains, birds, insects, animals. In many urban areas, traffic has become the keynote sound.

- Sound signals

These are foreground sounds, which are listened to consciously; examples would be warning devices, bells, whistles, horns, sirens, etc.

- Soundmark

This is derived from the term landmark. A soundmark is a sound which is unique to an area. In his 1977 book, The Soundscape: Our Sonic Environment and the Tuning of the World, Schafer wrote, "Once a Soundmark has been identified, it deserves to be protected, for soundmarks make the acoustic life of a community unique."

The elements have been further defined as to essential sources:

Bernie Krause, naturalist and soundscape ecologist, redefined the sources of sound in terms of their three main components: geophony, biophony, and anthropophony.

- Geophony

Consisting of the prefix, geo (gr. earth), and phon (gr. sound), this refers to the soundscape sources that are generated by non-biological natural sources such as wind in the trees, water in a stream or waves at the ocean, and earth movement, the first sounds heard on earth by any sound-sentient organism.

- Biophony

Consisting of the prefix, bio (gr. life) and the suffix for sound, this term refers to all of the non-human, non-domestic biological soundscape sources of sound.

- Anthropophony

Consisting of the prefix, anthro (gr. human), this term refers to all of the sound signatures generated by humans.

== In health care ==
Research has traditionally focused mostly on the negative effects of sound on human beings, as in exposure to environmental noise. Noise has been shown to correlate with health-related problems like stress, reduced sleep and cardiovascular disease. More recently however, it has also been shown that some sounds, like sounds of nature and music, can have positive effects on health, some of which might be explained by natural sounds increasing cognitive restoration and feelings of calm, for example. While the negative effects of sound has been widely acknowledged by organizations like EU (END 2002/49) and WHO (Burden of noise disease), the positive effects have as yet received less attention. The positive effects of nature sounds can be acknowledged in everyday planning of urban and rural environments, as well as in specific health treatment situations, like nature-based sound therapy and nature-based rehabilitation.

Soundscapes from a computerized acoustic device with a camera may also offer synthetic vision to the blind, utilizing human echolocation, as is the goal of the seeing with sound project.

== Soundscapes and noise pollution ==
Papers on noise pollution are increasingly taking a holistic, soundscape approach to noise control. Whereas acoustics tends to rely on lab measurements and individual acoustic characteristics of cars and so on, soundscape takes a top-down approach. Drawing on John Cage's ideas of the whole world as composition, soundscape researchers investigate people's attitudes to soundscapes as a whole rather than individual aspects – and look at how the entire environment can be changed to be more pleasing to the ear. This body of knowledge approaches the sonic environment subjectively as well, as in how some sounds are tolerated while others disdained, with still others preferred, as seen in Fong's 2016 research comparing the soundscapes of Bangkok, Thailand and Los Angeles, California. To respond to unwanted sounds, however, a typical application of this is the use of masking strategies, as in the use of water features to cover unwanted white noise from traffic. It has been shown that masking can work in some cases, but that the successful outcome is dependent on several factors, like sound pressure levels, orientation of the sources, and character of the water sound.

Research has shown that variation is an important factor to consider, as a varied soundscape give people the possibility to seek out their favorite environment depending on preference, mood and other factors. One way to ensure variation is to work with "quiet areas" in urban situations. It has been suggested that people's opportunity to access quiet, natural places in urban areas can be enhanced by improving the ecological quality of urban green spaces through targeted planning and design and that in turn has psychological benefits.

Soundscaping as a method to reduce noise pollution incorporates natural elements rather than just man made elements. Soundscapes can be designed by urban planners and landscape architects. By incorporating knowledge of soundscapes in their work, certain sounds can be enhanced, while others can be reduced or controlled. It has been argued that there are three main ways in which soundscapes can be designed: localization of functions, reduction of unwanted sounds and introduction of wanted sounds, each of which should be considered to ensure a comprehensive approach to soundscape design.

== In United States National Parks ==
The National Park Service Natural Sounds and Night Skies Division actively protects the soundscapes and acoustic environments in national parks across the country. Acoustic resources are physical sound sources, including both natural sounds (wind, water, wildlife, vegetation) and cultural and historic sounds (battle reenactments, tribal ceremonies, quiet reverence).

The acoustic environment is the combination of all the acoustic resources within a given area – natural sounds and human-caused sounds – as modified by the environment. The acoustic environment includes sound vibrations made by geological processes, biological activity, and even sounds that are inaudible to most humans, such as bat echolocation calls. Soundscape is the component of the acoustic environment that can be perceived and comprehended by the humans. The character and quality of the soundscape influence human perceptions of an area, providing a sense of place that differentiates it from other regions.

Noise refers to sound which is unwanted, either because of its effects on humans and wildlife, or its interference with the perception or detection of other sounds. Cultural soundscapes include opportunities for appropriate transmission of cultural and historic sounds that are fundamental components of the purposes and values for which the parks were established.

== See also ==
- Ambient music
- Anthropophony
- Biomusic
- Biophony
- Ecoacoustics
- Environments (series)
- Field recording
- Geophony
- Human auditory ecology
- Musique concrète
- Noise map
- Program music
- Sharawadji effect
- Sound art
- Sound installation
- Sound map
- Sound sculpture
- Soundscape ecology
- Space music
- Underwater acoustics
