= Acoustic ecology =

Study of human and environmental sounds

This is a spectrogram of a honeybee looking for nectar in some flowers, Genista triacanthos.

Acoustic ecology, sometimes called ecoacoustics or soundscape studies, is a discipline studying the relationship, mediated through sound, between human beings and their environment. Acoustic ecology studies started in the late 1960s with R. Murray Schafer a musician, composer and former professor of communication studies at Simon Fraser University (Vancouver, British Columbia, Canada) with the help of his team there as part of the World Soundscape Project. The original WSP team included Barry Truax, Hildegard Westerkamp, Bruce Davies and Peter Huse, among others. The first study produced by the WSP was titled The Vancouver Soundscape. This innovative study raised the interest of researchers and artists worldwide, creating enormous growth in the field of acoustic ecology. In 1993, the members of the by now large and active international acoustic ecology community formed the World Forum for Acoustic Ecology.

The radio art of Schafer and his colleague, has found expression in many different fields. While most have taken some inspiration from Schafer's writings, in recent years there have also been divergences from the initial ideas. The expanded expressions of acoustic ecology are increasing due to the sonic impacts of road and airport construction that affect the soundscapes in and around cities where the human population is more dense. There has also been a broadening of bioacoustics (the use of sound by animals) to consider the subjective and objective responses of animals to human noise, with ocean noise capturing the most attention. Acoustic ecology can also be informative of changes in the climate or other environmental changes since every day we listen to sounds in the world to identify their source such as bird, car, plane, wind, water. But we don't listen those sounds as a network, a mesh of relationships that form an ecology. Acoustic ecology finds expression in many different fields that characterize a soundscape, which are biophony, geophony, and anthrophony.

== Bioacoustics ==
Noise is generally a by-product of increased urbanization and development. As our cities became more industrialized, the volume and frequency of anthrophony, man-made noise signals, increased. Noise can alter the acoustic environment of aquatic and terrestrial habitats.

Animal biodiversity has shown to decline because of chronic noise levels in cities and along roadways. Musician and soundscape ecologist Bernie Krause relates biophony to an orchestra, where different groups of animals in an environment make sounds at different levels to avoid overlap or competition in their communication. Manmade noise such as jets flying over a habitat can disrupt the natural order of these sounds, even putting certain species in danger of predators. For example, some frogs synchronize in a way that protects individuals from attracting attention. The noise of a jet can cause the frogs to stop or fall out of sync, temporarily breaking this effect and exposing them to other animals.

On land, animal communication is shaped by physical characteristics of an environment such as distance, range of vision, weather, and surrounding noise. The physical layout of a habitat may impede the spread of soundwaves while air conditions can affect sound quality and speed. Animals can adapt to factors like distance by adjusting the frequency and amplitute of their calls to maximize communication effectiveness. Some species such as the urban great tits have changed the frequency of their calls to adapt. Soundscapes of particular habitats are always evolving because the activities and species that exist in those habitats changes over time.

In terms of evolution, man-made noise is a much more recent phenomenon. Indeed, through investigating collected recordings, ecologists can study ethology of animal acoustic communication, evolution, and development of acoustic behavior, relationships between animal sounds and their environment. However, all those ecological research goals have a precondition that those bioacoustic recordings are well investigated so that the animal species can be accurately recognized. Scientific research has shown that it has potential to change behavior, alter physiology and even restructure animal communities.

== Soundscapes ==
Soundscapes are composed of the anthrophony, geophony and biophony of a particular environment. They are specific to location and change over time. Acoustic ecology aims to study the relationship between these things, i.e. the relationship between humans, animals and nature, within these soundscapes. These relationships are delicate and subject to disruption by natural or man-made means.

In his book The Tuning of the World, Schafer used new terms like 'soundmarks' -- a specific community's distinctive sounds—and 'keynotes' -- prevalent but overlooked background sounds such as traffic—to help categorize the different elements of a soundscape.

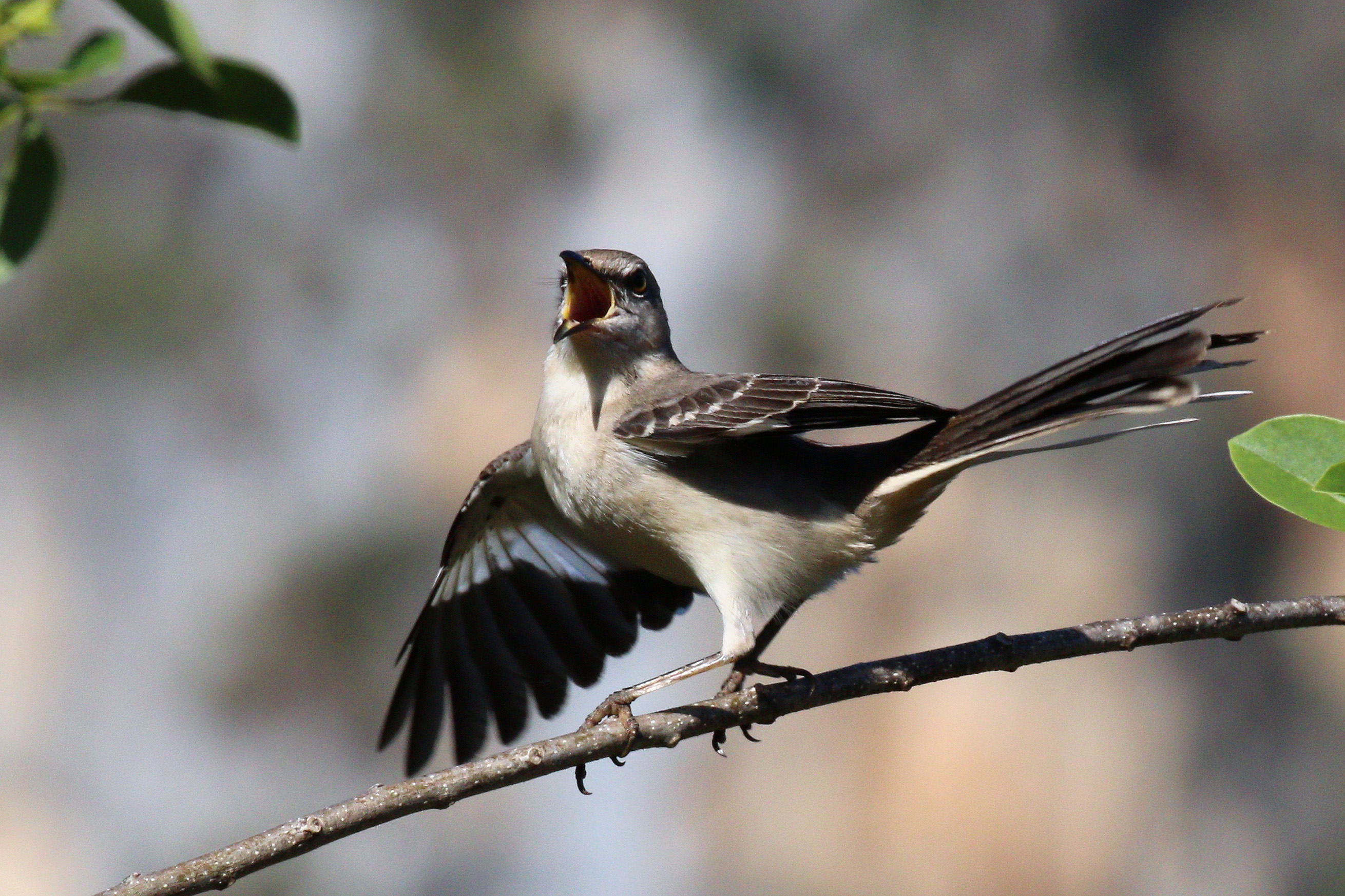
A Northern Mockingbird calling and flashing its wings. Bird calls are an example of Biophony: calls of a Northern Mockingbird––a song bird noted for its mimicry and wide range of calls.

=== Biophony ===
Biophony is the study of sounds emerging from animal sources, like whale vocalizations or birdsongs.

A thunderstorm in Berlin. Sounds produced by storms are examples of Geophony. The sounds of a thunderstorm, recorded during a hot summer day in Germany.

=== Geophony ===
Geophony can be defined as the sounds originating from the Earth's natural processes, such as the blowing of wind or movement of waves.

Several aircraft taxiing at Boston Logan Airport. Anthrophony can be quite loud and interfere with both the biophonic and geophonic soundscape. Some planes taking off at Polderbaan, Schiphol airport, the Netherlands.

=== Anthrophony ===
Anthrophony is the soundscape defined by man-made sources, like speech or road noise.

Research on the relationship between visual and auditory experiences in urban settings finds that the positive or negative visual perceptions of a landscape can directly affect the emotional assessment of the location's soundscape. A pleasant view or comfortable surroundings can increase people's tolerance and even appreciation for the sounds of an environment.

People's preferences for noise control have been shown to differ based on the culture and technology of the time period as well as the familiarity or practicality of certain sounds. For example, accepted sources of loud noise such as church bells or trucks may not bother a neighborhood as much as someone's new leaf blower, even if it is not as loud as more familiar sounds. This is why it is considered difficult to generalize which sounds are unwanted in a community.

Studying the soundscapes and traumatic impact of war has shown the effectiveness of noise as a psychological weapon to produce fear.

== Impacts of Man-Made Sound on Biospheres ==
Aircraft activity has been a continuing development around the world and has potential to change social-ecological systems. In Alaska, for example the communities are reporting that the aircraft disturb wildlife and negatively influence harvest practices and experiences. The limited data has restricted knowledge about the extent of aircraft activity over traditional harvest areas. The aircraft overflight around the rural subsistence is increasing and has reached a median of 12 overflights per day near human development, which is six times greater than undeveloped areas. Therefore, those planes startle caribou prefer to avoid aircraft themselves, which has a result that they will need to go farther to do a better harvest, but this will occur in adding some costs for fuel, equipment, and the effort for sure. Those kind of examples help to understand the impact on social-ecological dynamics in Antarctica.

The ambient noise present within the world's oceans; geophonic, anthrophonic, and biophonic, has been identified as a critical indicator to the well-being of the regional biosphere.

== Acoustic niche ==
The acoustic niche hypothesis, as proposed by acoustic ecologist Bernie Krause in 1993, refers to the process in which organisms partition the acoustic domain, finding their own niche in frequency and/or time in order to communicate without competition from other species. The theory draws from the ideas of niche differentiation and can be used to predict differences between young and mature ecosystems. Similar to how interspecific competition can place limits on the number of coexisting species that can utilize a given availability of habitats or resources, the available acoustic space in an environment is a limited resource that is partitioned among those species competing to utilize it.

In mature ecosystems, species will sing at unique bandwidths and specific times, displaying a lack of interspecies competition in the acoustic environment. Conversely, in young ecosystems, one is more likely to encounter multiple species using similar frequency bandwidths, which can result in interference between their respective calls, or a complete lack of activity in uncontested bandwidths. Biological invasions can also result in interference in the acoustic niche, with non-native species altering the dynamics of the native community by producing signals that mask or degrade native signals. This can cause a variety of ecological impacts, such as decreased reproduction, aggressive interactions, and altered predator-prey dynamics. The degree of partitioning in an environment can be used to indicate ecosystem health and biodiversity.

== List of compositional works ==
=== "Dominion" by Barry Truax ===
"Dominion" uses Canadian soundmarks that were made in different province by the World Soundscape Project at Simon Fraser University for an event of cross-country tour that happened in 1973. What is interesting about those sounds is that they are stretched over the time, so the extended versions allowed the people that listen to the sound in a more harmonic way. Those unique sound signals, were picked up by the live performers and then amplified to give the best experience possible to his audience.

=== Archaeoacoustics ===
This is a subfield of archeology and acoustics that in general study the relation between people and sound along the history. This is an interdisciplinary field that has methodological contributions from acoustics, archeology and computer simulation. Many cultures explored through archaeology were mostly focused on the oral, which lead the researchers to believe that studying the sonic nature of archaeological sites and artifacts may reveal new information on the civilization being scrutinized. Marc E. Moglen (2007) recreated pre-historical Soundscapes (Acoustic Ecology) at University of California, Berkeley's Department of Anthropology, combining compositional techniques with site recordings for a non-diegetic piece in the virtual world of Second Life, on "Okapi Island" At the Center for New Media the acoustic ecological setting of the former jazz scene in Oakland, CA was developed for a virtual world setting.

== See also ==
- Biophony
- Bernie Krause
- Human auditory ecology
- Lombard effect
- Marine mammals and sonar
- Fisheries acoustics
- Noise map
- Soundscape
- Ecomusicology

== Bibliography ==
- Keller, Marcello Sorce (2013). "The Windmills of my Mind – Musings about Haydn, Kant, Sonic Ecology, and Hygiene". In Jähnichen, Gisa; Meddegoda, Chinthaka (eds.). Music Dance Environment. Universiti Putra Malaysia Press. pp. 1–31. ISBN 978-967-344-337-6.
