= Darren Copeland =

Canadian composer

Darren Copeland is an electroacoustic music composer born June 18, 1968, in Bramalea, Ontario, Canada, and currently living in Brampton, Ontario, Canada.

Born in Brampton, Ontario, in 1968, Darren Copeland has been active as an electroacoustic composer and sound designer since 1985 producing works for concert, radio, theater, dance, and site-specific installation.

== Music ==
His entry into music and sound was unusual. In the 1980s as a teenager he discovered analog synthesizers almost by accident. And with no previous formal musical training or even interest in music, he started studying analog synthesizers and early digital samplers through private studies with Pier Rubesa in Toronto. This led to the creation of his own compositions and collaborations with musician Ed Troscianczyk and poet/visual artist John Marriott and others in the experimental music scene in Toronto. With these artists, Darren self-published a number of cassette compilations of the work produced at this time, including Living it Out - in the Dear Air - Space, The Three Faces, Mahwje's Outlook, An Introduction in Frost, and Dreams of Darkness.

After high school Darren studied theater sound design at Niagara College and parallel to this began making pieces using only environmental sounds. He then moved to Vancouver from 1989 to '95 to study electroacoustic composition at Simon Fraser University and was introduced to the research of the World Soundscape Project through his studies with Barry Truax which intensified his focus on soundscape composition. The compositions Faith-Annihia and Always Becoming Somebody Else included on the disc Perdu et retrouvé and the works included on his previous empreintes DIGITALes release Rendu visible are an outcome of this intensive investigation of soundscape recordings and electroacoustic composition.

His interest in soundscape recordings was motivated by wanting to understand better the associations that different listeners had to various environmental sounds. Reactions to pieces like Always Becoming Somebody Else and others from that period often brought very personal and contradictory reactions from listeners. Darren at the time concluded that this might have something to do with the visual bias of western society and the lack of a common vocabulary for talking about sound in everyday experience.

He felt that there were two solutions that would help him to better understand the visual bias of the listener: one was to investigate the nature of listening and perception more; the other solution was to combine sounds with texts and stories in order to present sounds inside a specific social or psychological context that provided more of a focus to the wide array of associations latent in the listening imagination. And so, in the mid-nineties, he branched out into other forms and made pieces that moved into the realm of theater, radio documentary, radio drama, and sound-text composition. He created an adaptation of August Strindberg's (1849–1912) play A Dream Play (1901), which became the first radio drama at CBC conceived for broadcast in Surround 5.1.

In 1996–97, Darren undertook his postgraduate studies at University of Birmingham (UK) and completed his soundscape documentary Life Unseen in which he investigated how blind people listen and function in a visual-centered society. Following this intensive study at Birmingham, he composed The Toronto Sound Mosaic, the soundtrack for Samuel Beckett's (1906–89) play That Time (1975) (produced by Threshold Theater), and his text-sound composition Lapse in Perception (produced for CBC Radio program Out Front). Through the late-nineties to 2002, Darren collaborated heavily in the theater and dance community in Toronto making soundtracks that integrated sound in a compelling fashion and this process also brought insight into the associative qualities of environmental sounds.

More recently, he has returned to abstraction again, using more sounds that are not environmental or recognizable. Works such as They're Trying to Save Themselves, Streams of Whispers and The Wrong Mistakes represent this interest, but have a similar dynamic flow and textural sense to the earlier works that use environmental sounds. Other works like On Schedule and On a Strange Road use environmental sounds in a more conceptual way and are less conscious of rendering the acoustic environment in a faithful or believable fashion.

As well as being a sound artist and composer, Darren Copeland is also the Artistic Director of New Adventures in Sound Art (NAISA), which produces electroacoustic and experimental sound art events in Toronto (Canada). With NAISA he has also toured Europe and Canada performing in concerts, facilitating workshops, and giving lectures with a focus on octophonic spatialization. He also currently serves on the board of directors for the Canadian Association for Sound Ecology (CASE), and previously for the Canadian Electroacoustic Community (CEC), Vancouver Pro Musica, and Rumble Productions.

== Recordings ==
- Perdu et retrouvé (empreintes DIGITALes, IMED 0683, 2006)
- Rendu visible (empreintes DIGITALes, IMED 9841, 1998)
- Let Me Out (empreintes DIGITALes, IMED 9100, 2009)

== List of works ==
- A Dream Play (1995–98), 5.1 tape
- Always Becoming Somebody Else (1991–92)
- An Introduction in Frost (1987)
- A Sketch for Prometheus Bound (1989)
- Bats & Elephants (2011)
- Darkness Colours (1994)
- Dreams of Darkness (1985–86)
- Driving Through Turbulence (2000)
- Early Signals (2001)
- Faith-Annihia (1991)
- Ich will kein Inmich mehr sein (2005)
- Lapse in Perception (1998–99)
- Life Unseen (1996–97)
- Living it Out - in the Dear Air - Space (1987–88)
- Mahwje's Outlook (1986)
- Maritime Vision
- Memory (1998)
- Night Camera (1993, 96)
- On a Strange Road (2003)
- On Schedule (2003)
- Reaching for Tomorrow (1995)
- Recharting the Senses (1996)
- Rendered Visible (1995)
- Residence Elsewhere (1993–96)
- Streams of Whispers (2002)
- They're Trying to Save Themselves (2002)
- The Three Faces (1986–87)
- The Toronto Sound Mosaic (2000)
- The Wrong Mistakes (2003)
- Zero and One: Stations and Directions (1992)
