= Hildegard Westerkamp =

Canadian composer

- Born: April 8, 1946 (age 80); Osnabrück, Germany
- Education: University of British Columbia, Simon Fraser University
- Known for: composer, radio art, acoustic ecology
- Notable work: Fantasie for Horns I (1978) A Walk Through the City (1981) Harbour Symphony (1986) Cricket Voice (1987) Kits Beach Soundwalk (1989) Beneath the Forest Floor (1992) Gently Penetrating Beneath the Sounding Surfaces of Another Place (1997) Into the Labyrinth (2000) Attending to Sacred Matters (2002) MotherVoiceTalk (2008)
- Website: www.hildegardwesterkamp.ca

Hildegard Westerkamp (born April 8, 1946, in Osnabrück, Germany) is a Canadian composer, radio artist, teacher, and sound ecologist. She is known for her contributions to and development of acoustic ecology, soundscape composition, and soundwalks, particularly through her work on the World Soundscape Project in the 1970s and 1980s. She has written extensively on these topics for journals and conferences, including Organised Sound.

Westerkamp studied flute and piano at the Conservatory of Music in Freiburg, West Germany from 1966 to 1968, then moved to Canada to study for a Bachelor of Music degree from the University of British Columbia, which she earned in 1972. During this time as a student she encountered both Barry Truax and R. Murray Schafer, and began working for Schafer as part of the World Soundscape Project at Simon Fraser University (SFU) in 1973. She later enrolled as a student in the communications department and completed her thesis, entitled "Listening and Soundmaking: A Study of Music-As-Environment," for a Master of Arts degree in 1988; she taught acoustic communication at Simon Fraser until 1990. In 2024, Westerkamp received an honorary doctorate from SFU in recognition of her contributions to acoustic ecology, music composition, and sound studies.

Westerkamp became a naturalized citizen of Canada in 1975. In 1972, she married the Canadian poet and playwright Norbert Ruebsaat and collaborated with him on a number of projects before their separation. She later maintained a long-term relationship with Peter Grant, to whom her 1997 piece Talking Rain is dedicated; Grant died in 2014.

== Work ==
=== Music ===
Many of Westerkamp's compositions deal with the acoustic environment, a method of composing known as soundscape composition. As part of her work with the World Soundscape Project she listened to and catalogued the Project's field recording archives, and has since dedicated the majority of her work to pieces that involve the layering and manipulation of field recordings. She additionally popularized the creative method/experience of soundwalking, which she defines as "any excursion whose main purpose is to listen to the environment." Works such as Kits Beach Soundwalk are inspired by this practice.

Collaborations

She collaborated with director Gus Van Sant, with whom she seemed to share work that explored similar concepts. To quote Randolph Jordan, "Her compositions are ideally suited for helping to flesh out Van Sant's portraits of young people adrift in worlds from which they are seemingly detached, but who might well be pointing towards alternative modes of environmental awareness."

==== 1973–91 ====
From 1973–80 Westerkamp worked as a research associate along with R. Murray Schafer at the World Soundscape Project at Simon Fraser University. This work fed into Schafer's book The Tuning of the World. In 1974 she began working as a producer and host at CFRO (Vancouver Cooperative Radio). Through her work with Schafer and with radio, she developed a deep interest and concern for noise and the acoustic environment, which greatly influenced her style of composition. After this time, she began to experiment with recording, processing, and mixing environmental sounds in the recording studio.

Westerkamp was involved in several other research projects on noise, acoustic ecology and music. From 1974 to 1975, she was a researcher with the Noise Abatement Project of the Society Promoting Environmental Conservation in Vancouver.

Throughout the 1980s, she developed an interest in music for live performance, and in creating installations and other "composed environments" (sometimes in collaboration) for specific sites. In 1982, she was a researcher for the Women in Music project at Simon Fraser University. She is also a founding member of the World Forum on Acoustic Ecology (WFAE).

==== Since 1991 ====
After 1991, Westerkamp devoted herself to more fully to composing, lecturing, and writing, disseminating her compositions and ideas at concerts and conferences. She was editor of The Soundscape Newsletter from 1991 to 1995, and joined the editorial committee of Soundscape: The Journal of Acoustic Ecology, for the World Forum for Acoustic Ecology in 2000.

She has also composed soundtracks for radio dramas and film and her music has been featured in movies by Gus Van Sant including Elephant (2003) and Last Days (2005). She collaborated with Jesse Zubot on the electronic score for Koneline (2016).

Some of Westerkamp's works are directly related to feminism. In 1990, she composed "École Polytechnique", which was commissioned by Montréal Musiques Actuelles/New Music America. According to Andra McCartney and Marta McCarthy, "Hildegard Westerkamp's (1990) composition École Polytechnique is an artistic response to one of Canada's most profoundly disturbing mass murders, the 1989 slaying of fourteen women in Montreal, Quebec."

== Discography ==
Recordings featuring Westerkamp's compositions, chronologically:

- (1989) Kits Beach Soundwalk
- (1990) Anthology of Canadian Music: Electroacoustic music
- (1990) The Aerial 2
- (1990) Électro clips (empreintes DIGITALes, IMED 9004, rereleased 1996 as IMED 9604)
- (1994) Radio Rethink - art and sound transmission
- (1995) Der Verlust der Stille
- (1995) Klang Wege
- (1995) Transmissions From Broadcast Artists, Radius #4
- (1996) The Vancouver Soundscape
- (1996) Transformations (empreintes DIGITALes, IMED 9631)
- (1997) 1977-1997, 20 Jahre Osnabrücker Komponisten
- (1998) Harangue I (Earsay, ES 98001)
- (1998) Harangue II (Earsay, ES 98005)
- (1999) The Dreams of Gaia
- (1999) This Place is Dreaming (Kraak, K047)
- (2000) Radiant Dissonance
- (2002) Into India (Earsay, ES 02002)
- (2003) Musique inpirée et tirée du film Elephant
- (2003) S:on
- (2022) Breaking News (Earsay, ES 22001)
- (2023) Klavierklang (Earsay, ES 23003)

== List of works ==
=== Compositions ===
- Whisper Study (1975–79)
- Familie mit Pfiff (Theme and Variations) (1976)
- Fantasie for Horns I (1978)
- Fantasie for Horns II (1979)
- A Walk Through the City (1981)
- Cool Drool (1983)
- His Master's Voice (1985)
- Harbour Symphony (1986)
- Cricket Voice (1987)
- Moments of Laughter (1988)
- Kits Beach Soundwalk (1989)
- The Deep Blue Sea (1989)
- Breathing Room (1990)
- École polytechnique (1990)
- Beneath the Forest Floor (1992)
- India Sound Journal (1993)
- Sensitive Chaos (1995)
- Dhvani (1996)
- Talking Rain (1997)
- Gently Penetrating Beneath the Sounding Surfaces of Another Place (1997)
- Into the Labyrinth (2000)
- Attending to Sacred Matters (2002)
- Like a Memory (2002)
- Breaking News (2002)
- Liebes-Lied/Love Song (2005)
- Für Dich-For You (2005)
- MotherVoiceTalk (2008)
- Once Upon a Time (2012)
- Beads of Time Sounding (2016)
- Klavierklang (2017)
- The Soundscape Speaks - Soundwalking Revisited (2021)
- The Soundscape Speaks - A Remix (2022)

=== Composed environments and sound installations ===
- Cordillera (Music from the New Wilderness Festival, Western Front Gallery, Vancouver, Feb 1980)
- Zone of Silence Story, with Norbert Ruebsaat (Zone of Silence Project, Museum of Quebec, Quebec City, Dec 1985–Jan 1986
- Coon Bay (1988)
- Türen der Wahrnehmung (Ars Electronica '89, Linz, Austria, Sept 1989)
- Nada – An Experience in Sound, in collaboration with Savinder Anand, Mona Madan, and Veena Sharma (Mati Ghar, Indira Gandhi National Centre for the Arts Janpath, New Delhi, India, 10–25 Dec, 1998)
- At the Edge of Wilderness, in collaboration with photographer Florence Debeugny (Industrial Ear, Vancouver, Sept 8-16, 2000; Whyte Museum, Banff, 11 Oct, 2002 – 19 Jan, 2003; Victoria College of the Arts, Melbourne, 19–27 March 2003)
- Soniferous Garden, rev. of Part 4 of Nada (Engine 27, New York, 7–15 Nov, 2000; Sound Practice [first UKISC Conference on Sound Culture and Environments], Dartington College of Arts, UK, Feb 2001; CCNOA, Brussels, 2–9 Feb, 2003; x-tract Sculpture Musicale, Podewil, Berlin, 1–12 Apr, 2003)

== See also ==
- Music of Canada
- List of Canadian composers
