= Human auditory ecology =

Research program in hearing sciences

Human auditory ecology (HAE) is a research program in hearing sciences studying the interactions between humans and their acoustic environments.

== Concept ==
HAE studies the "relationship between the acoustic environments in which people live and their auditory needs in these environments. This auditory ecology, a concept initially coined by Stuart Gatehouse, therefore refers to the auditory environments in which humans live and function, the tasks to be undertaken by humans in these complex acoustic environments and the importance of these tasks in daily life and daily routines. The use of this concept was initially restricted to the case of urban life. However, urban habitats are relatively recent in humankind history and evolution, and natural soundscapes have preceded the apparition of Homo sapiens, some 300,000 years ago. For this reason, the concept of auditory ecology was extended to study a different and evolutionary-based question, namely how humans perceive ecological processes at work in natural habitats through their peripheral and central auditory system.

== Auditory perception of natural soundscapes ==
Natural soundscapes correspond to the complex arrangements of biological (animal vocalizations) and geophysical (wind, rain, stream) sounds shaped by sound propagation through non-anthropogenic habitats. According to its most recent definition, human auditory ecology (HAE) is a multidisciplinary research programme attempting to map and explain the ability of normal-hearing and hearing-impaired human listeners to perceive natural soundscapes. In this specific case, HAE aims at characterizing how and to which extent humans perceive ecological processes underlying habitats marginally affected by human activity through their ears and their auditory brain, with a life-span perspective. HAE could be considered as a field of auditory psychophysics, auditory neurosciences and audiology. More broadly, HAE aims to encourage hearing scientists who traditionally work on speech and music perception in urban settings to collaborate with soundscape ecologists, ecoacousticians and neuro-ethologists, and share expertise with environmental and architectural acousticians, anthropologists, philosophers and geographers.

== Extended definition of human auditory ecology ==
HAE studies the (presumably ancestral) monitoring functions of the human auditory system. These monitory auditory functions are used by human auditory system to build a perceptual representation of the close environment, orient and navigate, assess resources (food, water, shelter) and danger (e.g., flooding, predators), opportunities for action, and the general health of the environment. These monitoring functions are assumed to help human listeners build a sense of place and time and operate in their acoustic environment.

From such a perspective, HAE is based on (i) concepts derived from soundscape ecology such as the acoutic adaptation and acoustic niche hypothesis, and (ii) psychophysical and neuroscientific models and methods. HAE operates on the large acoustic databases of natural soundscapes collected by soundscape ecologists and eco-acousticians using standardized procedures and recording material. HAE aims to characterize the monitoring functions of the human auditory system through ordinary listening behaviors (listening to animal vocalisations such as bird songs or insect stridulations, detecting presence of water or rain, assessing water discharge or wind strength ...). Moreover, HAE investigates the extent to which these monitoring functions are adapted to specific information conveyed by natural soundscapes, whether they operate throughout the life span or whether they emerge through individual learning or cultural transmission.

HAE aims to identify testable working hypotheses guided by computational models of the human auditory system, in order to (i) unveil low and high-level auditory mechanisms engaged in the auditory perception of soundscapes associated with natural habitats, green or blue species within or outside cities, (ii) how they develop through life and (iii) the extent to which they are affected by exposure, learning and culture. Although HAE aims to improve fundamental knowledge on the human auditory system and how humans interact with natural environments, it also aims at providing novel solutions to screen and rehabilitate hearing loss via hearing aids and cochlear implants.

== Acoustical aspects ==
=== Contribution of soundscape ecology and ecoacoustics ===
Because most vertebrate species send and receive sound for essential life functions (e.g., navigation, courtship, foraging), the collection of sounds perceived in an environment (i.e., soundscapes) can reflect ecological processes. Thus, by studying the structure of the soundscape over space and time, soundscape ecology and ecoacoustics aim to study the dynamics of ecological processes. Soundscape ecology is predicated on two key hypotheses: the acoustic niche hypothesis, where signals have evolved to partition in acoustic space to minimize overlap between species and the acoustic adaptation hypothesis, which states that species' optimize transmission of vocalizations to overcome habitat constraints. Although, the acoustic adaptation hypothesis has received limited support in experimental studies. Recent developments in passive sound collection offer the opportunity to cost-effectively monitor soundscapes at enormous scales. For example, the Australian Acoustic Observatory comprises 360 permanent recording stations and the National Park Service's Natural Sounds and Night Skies division have collected recordings at over 490 sites across the United States. Extracting relevant biological information from resulting enormous datasets remains challenging. Species vocalizations of interest may be manually or automatically extracted, using listening, visualizations of spectrograms, or recognition algorithms. Alternatively, acoustic indices can be used to summarize the properties of the soundscape.

=== Contribution of computational auditory sciences ===
The pioneering work of Singh and Theunissen suggests that high spectral modulations (harmonicity) and slow amplitude modulations distinguish biological (animal vocalizations) from geophysical sounds (wind, rain, stream sounds) in natural scenes. Subsequent work by McDermott and Simoncelli showed that geophysical sounds such as wind, rain or stream sounds can be distinguished from other sounds by their textural properties. The latter are reflected in specific regularities or "statistics" of amplitude-modulation patterns computed by the human auditory system in response to these sounds.

The statistics of these sounds and scenes could be characterized further using the large, ecologically valid databases collected by soundscape ecologists and ecoacousticians, allowing to test further efficient-coding principles positing that perceptual systems (e.g., the auditory system) have evolved to encode environmental stimuli in the most efficient way, and that the properties of auditory mechanisms closely match the statistical properties of natural sounds and scenes. The first studies based on this approach indicate that the central auditory system of humans has access to sufficient sensory information in the spectro-temporal domain to achieve accurate auditory discrimination of terrestrial biomes and their changes across moments of the day and seasons.

== Psychoacoustical aspects ==
=== Historical background ===
HAE aims to understand human auditory perception of natural (i.e. biophonic and geophonic) acoustic environments. In contrast, the majority of experimental studies of human auditory perception have utilized parametrically generated stimuli which lack acoustic complexity of natural environmental sounds. The prevailing methodological paradigms of psychoacoustics have traditionally focused on investigating how sounds' physical properties relate to the perception of abstract sound qualities such as pitch, loudness and duration without considering sounds' semantic or referential aspects. Furthermore, traditional psychoacoustic methods have relied primarily on detection and discrimination tasks in which a specific acoustic parameter is manipulated (e.g. frequency or intensity) under conditions of low stimulus uncertainty and performed by trained listeners. Overall, traditional psychoacoustics has been highly successful in describing human auditory abilities in relationship to underlying anatomy and physiology, leading to tremendous breakthroughs and achievements in communication and audio technology. However, this approach has had limited utility for understanding the perception of meaningful acoustically complex environmental sounds in everyday life, which typically involves perception of sound producing objects and events along with associated materials and actions.

=== Ecological psychoacoustics ===
A growing awareness of these limitations to ecological validity in traditional psychoacoustics has led to the broadening of theoretical approaches and modifications of experimental procedures used in the studies of auditory perception to include tasks involving sound identification, categorization and comprehension. Later efforts explored principles of perceptual organization of complex auditory scenes (under the general framework of auditory scene analysis) and formulated questions in terms of actionable and behaviorally relevant properties of specific sound (under the framework of ecological psychology). A further attempt to bridge the gap between investigations of auditory perception utilizing traditional psychoacoustic paradigms and those pertaining to everyday listening (ordinary listening behaviors) has been proposed under the general heading of ecological psychoacoustics. Ecological psychoacoustics generally considers auditory perception in terms of the ecologically relevant behavioral goals of the listener in specific tasks, situational contexts and environments (e.g. cognition-perception-action loop), while employing psychoacoustic experimental methods to maintain high internal validity.

For example, numerous studies have investigated aspects of listeners' perception of sound producing objects, materials, and actions solely based on associated environmental sounds. These studies consistently demonstrate remarkably accurate perception of sound sources based on acoustic signals alone. For instance, listeners can accurately judge the size and behavior of objects, such as predicting the timing of successive bounces of different types of balls, dropped from different heights, based on preceding sounds. Additionally, listeners can discern the sex and posture of a walker from the sound of their footsteps, estimate the volume of a container from the sound of liquid being poured into it, or infer the configuration of clapping hands from the sound produced.

=== Ecologically based taxonomies ===
Efforts have been also made to develop comprehensive ecologically based taxonomies that would apply to sounds of everyday listening environments and integrate them into broader acoustic communication frameworks. However, due to the large inherent variability and complexity of everyday environmental sounds, no general all-inclusive taxonomy has been developed. Nevertheless, valuable classifications have emerged, notably distinguishing between the perception of actions/events and objects/materials. Experimental approaches so far have also mostly failed to distinguish among different types of listening experience such as active and focused listening versus background listening when listener is not actively seeking one or more specific sounds by monitors environment as a whole. Furthermore, unlike HAE, previous approaches to the study of auditory perception have made no systematic distinction between natural (biophonic or geophonic) versus mechanically or electronically generated and technophonic sounds.

=== Auditory perception of natural soundscapes, biophony and geophony ===
Two psychoacoustical studies have explored the ability of human listeners to discriminate natural soundscapes in a categorical way. Consistent with predictions of a modelling study, these behavioral studies reveal that human listeners are able to discriminate soundscapes recorded by soundscape ecologists in a nature reserve with their ears only. More precisely, these studies showed that naive (untrained) listeners hear changes in habitat (forest, meadow, grassland, chaparral), moment of the day (dawn, dusk, etc.) and season (summer, fall, etc.), although this capacity is not optimal. Another psychoacoustical study based on 200 scenes including natural settings (forests, parks, hiking trails) corroborated the idea that human listeners consistently perceive global attributes of natural soundscapes, that is structural properties (e.g., openness), constancy properties (e.g., transience), or functional properties (e.g., navigability). These first studies pave the way for further empirical studies aiming to assess the human ability to perceive natural soundscapes and their variations using the sound databases recorded by soundscape ecologists and ecoacousticians.

=== Statistical representation in ecological sound perception ===
Many natural environments, such as a flock of birds singing in the trees or a swarm of insects chirping in the grass are composed of large numbers of similar sound events. As a result, their properties tend to be fairly stable over time. Such sounds are commonly referred to as "textures", and are thought to be represented in the auditory system with summary statistics. Specifically, the brain appears to base its decisions about such sounds on a time-averaged statistical representation, and does not retain the temporal acoustic detail of the individual sound features composing the texture. This average appears to be computed over a window of several seconds. The averaging process occurs even in the presence of other sounds, and helps us to hear other sounds that occur concurrently with a texture. The brain even appears to "fill in" the statistical properties of a texture when it is temporarily masked by a concurrent sound. In contrast, for sounds that are more temporally sparse, such as one bird singing, or a branch breaking, the auditory system does retain the temporal acoustic detail. It appears the auditory system employs two modes when listening to ecological sounds, one that retains the acoustic detail when the sounds are temporally sparse, and the other that averages the acoustic properties over time when the sounds are temporally dense. Although these two modes of hearing have been explored for individual sound sources and for superpositions of a texture with other sounds, we know less about how the auditory system operates when we hear mixtures of ecological sounds. This latter question is an active area of research in human auditory ecology.

== Developmental aspects ==
If human perceptual systems have evolved to efficiently encode environmental signals, as suggested by the efficient neural coding hypothesis, then these mechanisms may be evolutionarily ancestral, and as such may emerge early in ontogenetic development. Few studies to date have explicitly tested this hypothesis for natural sounds, and in general few studies have looked at how young children perceive environmental sounds other than speech and music.

One series of studies. investigated adults and young infants' perception of water sounds. According to the efficient neural coding hypothesis, perceptual systems need to extract the statistical structure of environmental stimuli in order to achieve an information theoretical optimum, i.e. encoding the greatest amount of information at the lowest cost. One common feature of the statistical structure of many natural stimuli is scale-invariance, the property of exhibiting the same statistical structure at different spatial or temporal scales. The studies conducted with water sounds tested whether sounds produced by a generative model of gamma tone chirps obeying scale-invariance were perceived as instances of natural water sounds, while those having a variable-scale structure were not. Indeed, adults rated a wide range of scale-invariant, but not variable-scale, sounds as natural recordings of brooks and streams, and qualitatively described them as various forms of water. Five-month-old infants also showed categorical discrimination between scale-invariant and variable-scale sounds, and the newborn brain just 1–3 days after birth responded differentially to scale-invariant and variable-scale water sounds in the left inferior frontal and temporal areas

In addition, many animal species communicate with auditory signals, and two groups have received particular attention in studies of children's perceptual sensitivities: primates, our closest phylogenetic relatives, and birds, some of which produce complex, acoustically rich vocalizations. Research has shown that from birth to about 3–4 months, infants do not exhibit selective processing for human speech over non-human primate vocalizations, although they maintain preferences for biological over artificial sounds. By 4–6 months, experience sharpens preferences toward speech, with neural responses diverging for human and primate vocalizations. Infants also show sensitivity to bird songs, with preferences for low-frequency seabird calls over higher-frequency garden bird songs, a pattern observed across different cultural contexts and possibly reflecting universal predispositions modulated by local exposure. Moreover, comparisons between bird song and speech suggest that infants prefer naturally produced sounds, human or non-human, over temporally distorted speech.

These results suggest that the perception of natural sounds may indeed be efficient early on in human development, and pave the way for further studies of this hypothesis involving a much greater variety of natural sounds and soundscapes. Indeed, determining whether children can discriminate between natural sounds, may reveal critical periods for tuning to environmental auditory features, analogous to those proposed for speech and music perception.

== Emotional aspects and health benefits ==
=== Psychological studies ===
Emotion perception of environmental sounds can be described within the dimensional view of affect, specifically along a combination of several continua. Two dimensions often dominate, specifically valence (unpleasant to pleasant) and arousal (calming to exciting), Although emotions could be high on either nor neither dimension, sounds that elicit emotions near the valence extremes (e.g., very pleasant or very unpleasant), also tend to be high in the arousal dimension (e.g., exciting or activating). The valence dimension reflects the motivational theory of emotion, where valence of an emotion supports a person's motivation. Unpleasant emotions (e.g., in response to a lion) facilitate attention and inspire action. Pleasant emotions (e.g., in response to birdsong) encourage approach behavior and support well-being, such as through stress recovery or creative thinking. Thus, both pleasant and unpleasant emotions serve important functions. Adults with permanent, sensorineural hearing loss do not report a full range of emotional responses to non-speech sounds; their range of ratings of valence is less extreme (less pleasant, less unpleasant) compared to their peers with normal hearing, even when they are similarly aged. This is true for natural and manmade sounds.

=== Soundscape ecology and ecoacoustics ===
Exposure to nature provides a variety of health benefits. Soundscapes in particular provide crucial information, where sounds enable most species, including humans, to surveil their surroundings. From an evolutionary perspective, a soundscape that is full of natural sounds, can be an indicator of an environment rich in resources needed for survival. Thus, a natural acoustic environment stimulates the parasympathetic nervous system, allowing mental recuperation and a reduction in stress-related behaviour. Two psychological theories explain the mechanistic basis of the restorative effects of exposure to natural soundscapes: Attention Restoration Theory, the ability of nature to replenish attention and Stress Recovery theory, where nature is less arousing than fatigue-inducing urban environments, leading to recovery from stress. A synthesis of studies examining the evidence of health benefits of natural soundscapes revealed decreased stress and annoyance and improved health and positive affective outcomes. Examples of beneficial outcomes of listening to natural sounds included decreased pain, lower stress, improved mood, and enhanced cognitive performance

=== Soundscape studies ===
Soundscape studies play an important role within the framework of HAE, focusing on human sensory and emotional auditory processing. Defined by ISO 12913 as the acoustic environment perceived by humans within a contextual framework, soundscape studies diverge from traditional environmental noise research by emphasizing positive health and perceptual outcomes, particularly regarding the (measurable) restorative properties of natural sounds. Additionally, there are important soundscape studies within spatial design such as Landscape Architecture, urban planning etc. Contrary to assumptions within HAE, soundscape studies reveal cultural variations in individuals' and communities' responses to natural sounds. The ISO 12913 series, comprising theoretical frameworks, data collection and data analysis methods, serves as a cornerstone in soundscape literature. Advancements in the field include innovative methods for visualizing and analyzing quantitative soundscape data, alongside prediction models that simulate human perceptions of present and future/hypothetical acoustic environments. These models utilize objective metrics as predictors and subjective metrics as descriptors, enabling a deeper understanding of how humans experience acoustic environments within context and driving progress in understanding and optimizing auditory experiences in natural habitats.

== Audiological aspects ==
=== Effects of aging and hearing loss ===
Older adults with normal hearing or with mild hearing losses appear to maintain generally robust source recognition of environmental sounds in quiet. However, when tested under more challenging conditions which closer approximate everyday listening environments, older adults with and without hearing loss require greater signal-to-noise ratio (SNR) to identify sounds in scenes. Middle-aged and older adults with normal hearing and those with some degree of sensorineural hearing loss also perform poorer than younger adults in tasks which involve perception of multiple environmental sounds. Furthermore, irrespective of age and severity of hearing loss, people with hearing loss exhibit great difficulties discriminating natural soundscapes that vary systematically in terms of place (forest, meadow, grassland, chaparral), moment of the day (dawn, midday, dusk and night) and season (autumn, winter, spring and summer)

=== Effects of conventional hearing aids ===
The primary complaint of people with hearing impairment is difficulty to understand speech in noise. As such, substantial knowledge has been acquired about mechanisms behind speech perception (2) and several speech-in-noise testing tools have been developed. People with hearing impairment can benefit from the use of hearing aids. Research in auditory reality of hearing aid users has shown that people spend approximately 31% of time in situations involving speech communication, whereas they spend about 45% of time in situations where they are monitoring surroundings or passive listening. It has been proposed that HAE should not be limited to the case of urban settings and communication but should be extended to perception of wild or rural soundscapes. The ability to experience sounds of nature can lead to feeling less pain, lower stress, enhanced mood and improved cognitive performance. People who use hearing aids report positive listening experiences that involve not only communication, but also perception of environmental and nature sounds (e.g., "the forest sounds completely different," "nice to hear the wind howling," "can hear traffic and the rain," "heard rustling leaves and rustling of the trees," "can hear the sparrow singing.").

=== Effects of cochlear implants ===
First time users of sensory aids, hearing aids and cochlear implants often report new or renewed ability to recognize various natural, machine-produced or electronic sounds in their environments. Improvement in environmental sound perception is frequently cited by adults with hearing loss as an anticipated benefit of sensory aids. Nevertheless, when explicitly tested, the ability of cochlear implant users to identify common environmental sounds shows considerable decrement compared to normal hearing peers. Limited current research, further indicates no significant improvement in environmental sound perception following implantation. Given the ubiquity of nonlinguistic environmental sounds as well as their recognized importance for maintaining personal safety, well-being and awareness of their surroundings. environmental sound perception appears to be a fertile area for theoretical and applied auditory perception research

=== Effects of hearing loss and hearing aids on emotional processing ===
Adults with permanent, sensorineural hearing loss do not experience a full range of emotional responses to non-speech sounds; they report emotional responses that are extreme (less pleasant and less unpleasant) than do their similarly aged peers with normal hearing. The reason for this reduced range of emotional responses is unclear. One explanation is audible bandwidth. Hearing loss in adults commonly causes changes in audible bandwidth, especially reduced audibility of high frequencies, such as those about 2000 Hz. However, low- and high-frequency cues (<800 and >2000 Hz, respectively) are important for emotional responses to non-speech sounds. Therefore, improving audibility of high frequency cues, such as with a hearing aid or cochlear implant, would be expected to expand the range of emotional responses to sound. However, even while using the current standard-of-care intervention for permanent hearing loss, including hearing aids, adults demonstrate this reduced range of pleasant responses Therefore, other acoustic cues, such as amplitude modulations, might play an important role in emotional processing of non-speech sounds. Because modern hearing aids have amplitude compression, it is possible that assistive listening devices are reducing the amplitude modulation cues important for emotional responses to sounds.

== Auditory awareness of environmental changes ==
=== Contribution of sounsdcape ecology and eco-acoustics ===
Soundscape ecology and ecoacoustics study ecological questions using the analysis of environmental sound. Because of their unique climate, vegetation and animal communities, ecosystems are associated with environmental sounds showing unique patterns and dynamics. Changing of those soundscapes have been shown to reflect local disturbances within ecosystems. This is exemplified by the invasive ant Wasmannia auropunctata affecting the local fauna and therefore silencing the forest of New Caledonia, the soundscape's diversity showing a flat response in burned area in comparison to unburned area, 3 years after a massive wildfire in the Chiricahua national monument in Arizona or the increase in biological sounds in cities during the COVID-19 pandemic.

Ethnographic surveys in human geography highlight the awareness of human beings in the face of these changes. Altogether, these findings warrant detailed psychoacoustical investigations aiming to assess the ability of human listeners to hear changes reflecting local disturbances within ecosystems.
