= Soundscape ecology =

Study of the effect of environmental sound on organisms

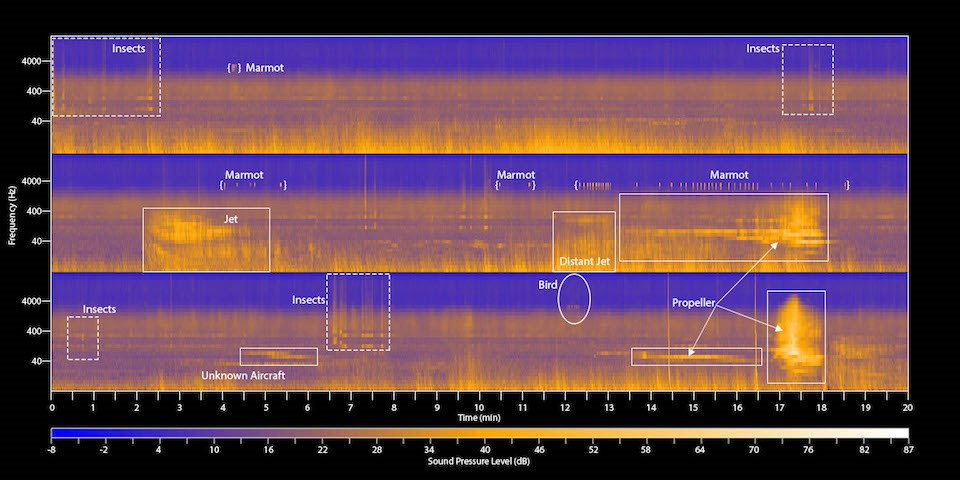
A spectrogram of the soundscape of Mount Rainier National Park in the United States. Highlighted areas show marmot, bird, insect and aircraft noises.

Soundscape ecology is the study of the acoustic relationships between living organisms, human and other, and their environment, whether the organisms are marine or terrestrial. First appearing in the Handbook for Acoustic Ecology edited by Barry Truax, in 1978, the term has occasionally been used, sometimes interchangeably, with the term acoustic ecology. Soundscape ecologists also study the relationships between the three basic sources of sound that comprise the soundscape: those generated by organisms are referred to as the biophony; those from non-biological natural categories are classified as the geophony, and those produced by humans, the anthropophony.

Increasingly, soundscapes are dominated by a sub-set of anthropophony (sometimes referred to in older, more archaic terminology as "anthropogenic noise"), or technophony, the overwhelming presence of electro-mechanical noise. This sub-class of noise pollution or disturbance may produce a negative effect on a wide range of organisms. Variations in soundscapes as a result of natural phenomena and human endeavor may have wide-ranging ecological effects as many organisms have evolved to respond to acoustic cues that emanate primarily from undisturbed habitats.

Soundscape ecologists use recording devices, audio tools, and elements of traditional ecological and acoustic analyses to study soundscape structure. Soundscape ecology has deepened current understandings of ecological issues and established profound visceral connections to ecological data. The preservation of natural soundscapes is now a recognized conservation goal.

== Background ==
As an academic discipline, soundscape ecology shares some characteristics with other fields of inquiry but is also distinct from them in significant ways. For instance, acoustic ecology is also concerned with the study of multiple sound sources. However, acoustic ecology, which derives from the founding work of R. Murray Schafer and Barry Truax, primarily focuses on human perception of soundscapes. Soundscape ecology seeks a broader perspective by considering soundscape effects on communities of living organisms, human and other, and the potential interactions between sounds in the environment. Compared to soundscape ecology, the discipline of bioacoustics tends to have a narrower interest in individual species' physiological and behavioral mechanisms of auditory communication. Soundscape ecology also borrows heavily from some concepts in landscape ecology, which focuses on ecological patterns and processes occurring over multiple spatial scales. Landscapes may directly influence soundscapes as some organisms use physical features of their habitat to alter their vocalizations. For example, baboons and other animals exploit specific habitats to generate echoes of the sounds they produce.

The function and importance of sound in the environment may not be fully appreciated unless one adopts an organismal perspective on sound perception, and, in this way, soundscape ecology is also informed by sensory ecology. Sensory ecology focuses on understanding the sensory systems of organisms and the biological function of information obtained from these systems. In many cases, humans must acknowledge that sensory modalities and information used by other organisms may not be obvious from an anthropocentric viewpoint. This perspective has already highlighted many instances where organisms rely heavily on sound cues generated within their natural environments to perform important biological functions. For example, a broad range of crustaceans are known to respond to biophony generated around coral reefs. Species that must settle on reefs to complete their developmental cycle are attracted to reef noise while pelagic and nocturnal crustaceans are repelled by the same acoustic signal, presumably as a mechanism to avoid predation (predator densities are high in reef habitats). Similarly, juvenile fish may use biophony as a navigational cue to locate their natal reefs, and may also be encouraged to resettle damaged coral reefs by playback of healthy reef sound. Other species' movement patterns are influenced by geophony, as in the case of the reed frog which is known to disperse away from the sound of fire. In addition, a variety of bird and mammal species use auditory cues, such as movement noise, in order to locate prey. Disturbances created by periods of environmental noise may also be exploited by some animals while foraging. For example, insects that prey on spiders concentrate foraging activities during episodes of environmental noise to avoid detection by their prey. These examples demonstrate that many organisms are highly capable of extracting information from soundscapes.

== Terminology ==
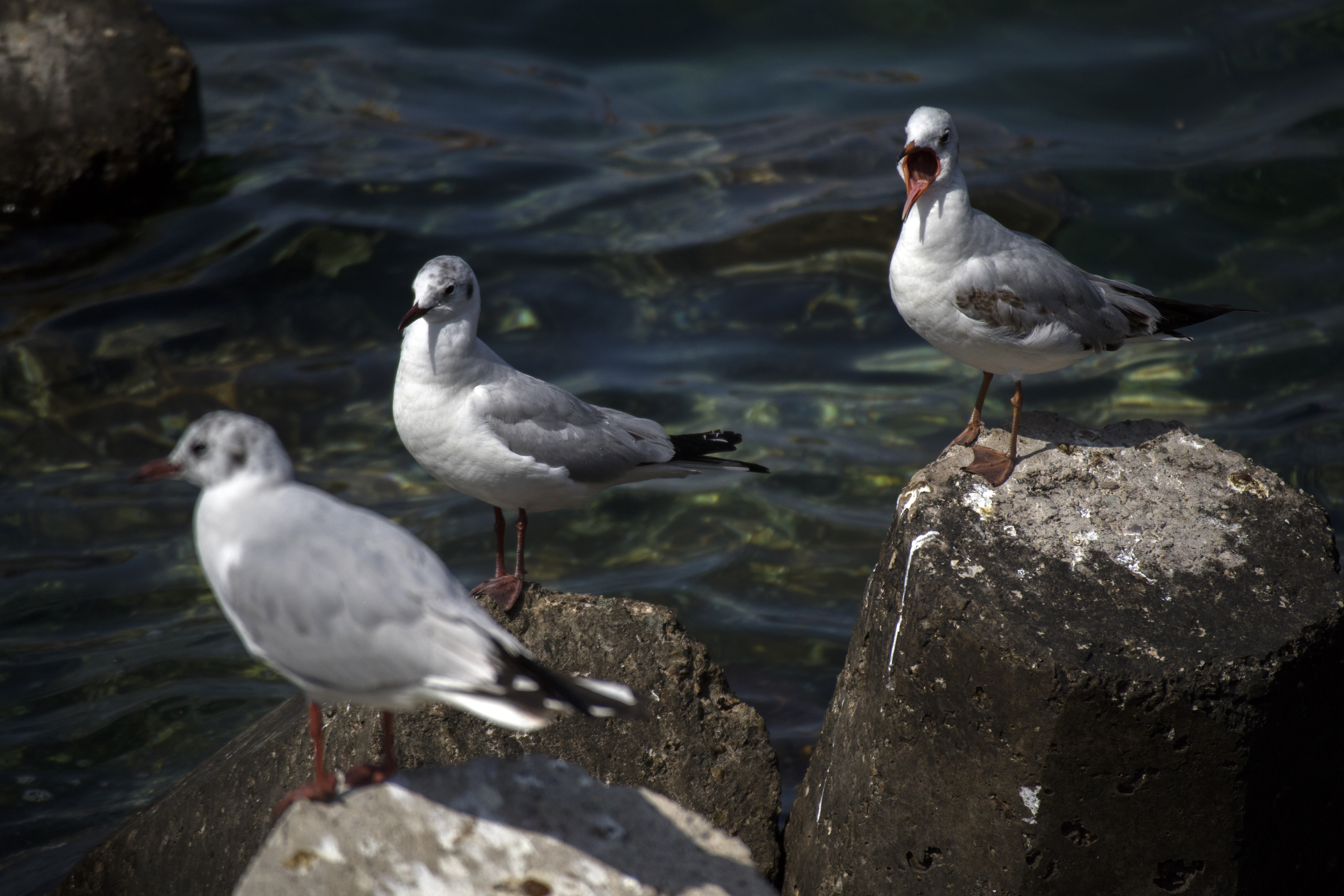
Natural soundscapes include natural but non-biological "geophonic" sounds (such as the water of the ocean) and the "biophonic" sounds of animals (such as bird calls).

According to academic Bernie Krause, soundscape ecology serves as a lens into other fields including medicine, music, dance, philosophy, environmental studies, etc. (the soundscape). Krause sees the soundscape of a given region as the sum of three separate sound sources (as described by Gage and Krause) defined as follows:

- Geophony, from the Greek prefix, geo, meaning earth-related, and phon, meaning sound, is a neologism used to describe one of three possible sonic components of a soundscape. It relates to the naturally occurring non-biological sounds coming from different types of habitats, whether marine or terrestrial. Typically, geophony refers to the sounds of natural forces, such as water, wind, and thunder, occurring in wild, relatively undisturbed habitats. But geophony is not limited to that narrow definition since these audio sources can be experienced nearly everywhere the effects of wind and water are expressed.
- Biophony is a term introduced by Krause, who in 1998, first began to express the soundscape in terms of its acoustic sources. The biophony refers to the collective acoustic signatures generated by all sound-producing organisms in a given habitat at a given moment. It includes vocalizations that are used for conspecific communication in some cases. Biophony consists of the Greek prefix, bio, meaning life, and the suffix, phon, meaning sound, is a neologism used to describe the collective sound that vocalizing animals create in each given environment. It explores new definitions of animal territory as defined by biophony, and addresses changes in density, diversity, and richness of animal populations. Mapping soundscapes can help to illustrate possible driving mechanisms and provide a valuable tool for urban management and planning. However, quantifying biophony across urban landscapes has proven difficult in the presence of anthrophony, or sounds generated by humans. The metric percent biophony (PB) can be used to quantify biophony while avoiding noise bias. The complete absence of biophony or geophony in a given biome would be expressed as dysphonia (from the Greek meaning the inability to produce a proper collective voice in this case). The niche hypothesis (also known as the acoustic niche hypothesis; ANH), an early version of the term biophony, describes the acoustic bandwidth partitioning process that occurs in still-wild biomes by which non-human organisms adjust their vocalizations by frequency and time-shifting to compensate for vocal territory occupied by other vocal creatures. Thus each species evolves to establish and maintain its own acoustic bandwidth so that its voice is not masked. For instance, notable examples of clear partitioning and species discrimination can be found in the spectrograms derived from the biophonic recordings made in most uncompromised tropical and subtropical rain forests. Additional studies with certain insects and amphibians tend to confirm the hypothesis.
- Anthropophony is another term introduced by Krause along with colleague, Stuart Gage. It represents human generated sound from either humans, themselves, or the electro-mechanical technologies they employ. The term, anthropophony, consisting of the Greek prefix, anthropo, meaning human, and the suffix, phon, meaning sound is a neologism used to describe all sound produced by humans, whether coherent, such as music, theatre, and language, or incoherent and chaotic such as random signals generated primarily by electromechanical means. Anthropophony is divided into two sub-categories. Controlled sound, such as music, language, and theatre, and chaotic or incoherent sound sometimes referred to as noise.

According to Krause various combinations of these acoustic expressions across space and time generate unique soundscapes.

Soundscape ecologists seek to investigate the structure of soundscapes, explain how they are generated, and study how organisms interrelate acoustically. A number of hypotheses have been proposed to explain the structure of soundscapes, particularly elements of biophony. For instance, an ecological theory known as the acoustic adaptation hypothesis predicts that acoustic signals of animals are altered in different physical environments in order to maximize their propagation through the habitat. In addition, acoustic signals from organisms may be under selective pressure to minimize their frequency (pitch) overlap with other auditory features of the environment. This acoustic niche hypothesis is analogous to the classical ecological concept of niche partitioning. It suggests that acoustic signals in the environment should display frequency partitioning as a result of selection acting to maximize the effectiveness of intraspecific communication for different species. Observations of frequency differentiation among insects, birds, and anurans support the acoustic niche hypothesis. Organisms may also partition their vocalization frequencies to avoid overlap with pervasive geophonic sounds. For example, territorial communication in some frog species takes place partially in the high frequency ultrasonic spectrum. This communication method represents an evolutionary adaptation to the frogs' riparian habitat where running water produces constant low frequency sound. Invasive species that introduce new sounds into soundscapes can disrupt acoustic niche partitioning in native communities, a process known as biophonic invasion. Although adaptation to acoustic niches may explain the frequency structure of soundscapes, spatial variation in sound is likely to be generated by environmental gradients in altitude, latitude, or habitat disturbance. These gradients may alter the relative contributions of biophony, geophony, and anthrophony to the soundscape. For example, when compared with unaltered habitats, regions with high levels of urban land-use are likely to have increased levels of anthrophony and decreased physical and organismal sound sources. Soundscapes typically exhibit temporal patterns, with daily and seasonal cycles being particularly prominent. These patterns are often generated by the communities of organisms that contribute to biophony. For example, birds chorus heavily at dawn and dusk while anurans call primarily at night; the timing of these vocalization events may have evolved to minimize temporal overlap with other elements of the soundscape.

== Methods ==
Acoustic information describing the environment is the primary data required in soundscape ecology studies. Technological advances have provided improved methods for the collection of such data. Automated recording systems allow for temporally replicated samples of soundscapes to be gathered with relative ease. Data collected from such equipment can be extracted to generate a visual representation of the soundscape in the form of a spectrogram. Spectrograms provide information on a number of sound properties that may be subject to quantitative analysis. The vertical axis of a spectrogram indicates the frequency of a sound while the horizontal axis displays the time scale over which sounds were recorded. In addition, spectrograms display the amplitude of sound, a measure of sound intensity. Ecological indices traditionally used with species-level data, such as diversity and evenness, have been adapted for use with acoustic metrics. These measures provide a method of comparing soundscapes across time or space. For example, automated recording devices have been used to gather acoustic data in different landscapes across yearlong time scales, and diversity metrics were employed to evaluate daily and seasonal fluctuations in soundscapes across sites. The demise of a habitat can be seen by measuring before and after "logging" for example. Spatial patterns of sound may also be studied using tools familiar to landscape ecologists such as geographic information systems (GIS). Finally, recorded samples of the soundscape can provide proxy measures for biodiversity inventories in cases where other sampling methods are impractical or inefficient. These techniques may be especially important for the study of rare or elusive species that are especially difficult to monitor in other ways.

== Insights from soundscape ecology: anthropophony ==
Although soundscape ecology has only recently been defined as an independent academic discipline (it was first described in 2011 and formalized at the first meeting of the International Society of Ecoacoustics, held in Paris in 2014), many earlier ecological investigations have incorporated elements of soundscape ecology theory. For instance, a large body of work has focused on documenting the effects of anthropophony on wildlife. Anthropophony (the uncontrolled version, is often used synonymously with noise pollution) can emanate from a variety of sources, including transportation networks or industry, and may represent a pervasive disturbance to natural systems even in seemingly remote regions such as national parks. A major effect of noise is the masking of organismal acoustic signals that contain information. Against a noisy background, organisms may have trouble perceiving sounds that are important for intraspecific communication, foraging, predator recognition, or a variety of other ecological functions. In this way, anthropogenic noise may represent a soundscape interaction wherein increased anthropophony interferes with biophonic processes. The negative effects of anthropogenic noise impact a wide variety of taxa including fish, amphibians, birds, and mammals. In addition to interfering with ecologically important sounds, anthropophony can also directly affect the biological systems of organisms. Noise exposure, which may be perceived as a threat, can lead to physiological changes. For example, noise can increase levels of stress hormones, impair cognition, reduce immune function, and induce DNA damage. Although much of the research on anthropogenic noise has focused on behavioral and population-level responses to noise disturbance, these molecular and cellular systems may prove promising areas for future work.

== Anthropophony and birds ==
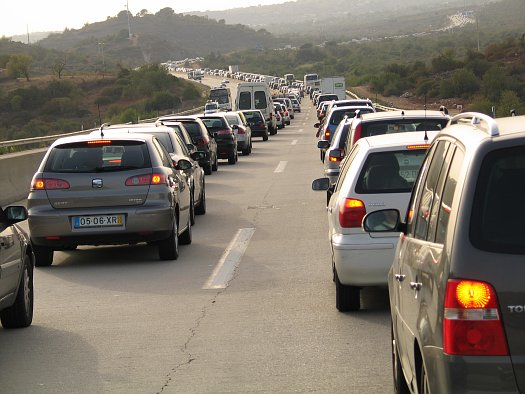
Anthropophony, sound generated from human activities, plays an important role in contemporary soundscapes.

Birds have been used as study organisms in much of the research concerning wildlife responses to anthropogenic noise, and the resulting literature documents many effects that are relevant to other taxa affected by anthropophony. Birds may be particularly sensitive to noise pollution given that they rely heavily on acoustic signals for intraspecific communication. Indeed, a wide range of studies demonstrate that birds use altered songs in noisy environments. Research on great tits in an urban environment revealed that male birds inhabiting noisy territories tended to use higher frequency sounds in their songs. Presumably these higher-pitched songs allow male birds to be heard above anthropogenic noise, which tends to have high energy in the lower frequency range thereby masking sounds in that spectra. A follow-up study of multiple populations confirmed that great tits in urban areas sing with an increased minimum frequency relative to forest-dwelling birds. In addition, this study suggests that noisy urban habitats host birds that use shorter songs but repeat them more rapidly. In contrast to frequency modulations, birds may simply increase the amplitude (loudness) of their songs to decrease masking in environments with elevated noise. Experimental work and field observations show that these song alterations may be the result of behavioral plasticity rather than evolutionary adaptations to noise (i.e., birds actively change their song repertoire depending on the acoustic conditions they experience). In fact, avian vocal adjustments to anthropogenic noise are unlikely to be the products of evolutionary change simply because high noise levels are a relatively recent selection pressure. However, not all bird species adjust their songs to improve communication in noisy environments, which may limit their ability to occupy habitats subject to anthropogenic noise. In some species, individual birds establish a relatively rigid vocal repertoire when they are young, and these sorts of developmental constraints may limit their ability to make vocal adjustments later in life. Thus, species that do not or cannot modify their songs may be particularly sensitive to habitat degradation as a result of noise pollution.

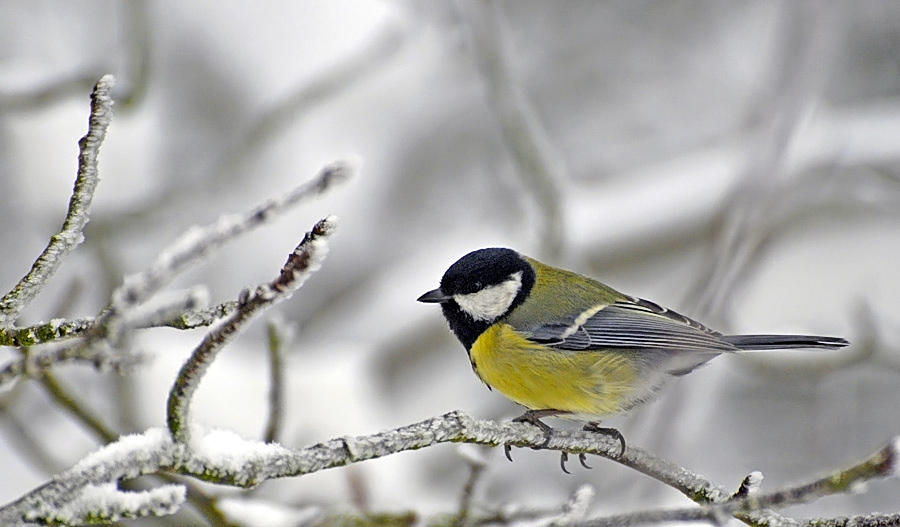
Effects of anthropophony on auditory communication are well studied in the great tit.

Even among birds that are able to alter their songs to be better heard in environments inundated with anthropophony, these behavioral changes may have important fitness consequences. In the great tit, for example, there is a tradeoff between signal strength and signal detection that depends on song frequency. Male birds that include more low frequency sounds in their song repertoire experience better sexual fidelity from their mates which results in increased reproductive success. However, low frequency sounds tend to be masked when anthropogenic noise is present, and high frequency songs are more effective at eliciting female responses under these conditions. Birds may therefore experience competing selective pressures in habitats with high levels of anthropogenic noise: pressure to call more at lower frequencies in order to improve signal strength and secure good mates versus opposing pressure to sing at higher frequencies in order to ensure that calls are detected against a background of anthrophony. In addition, use of certain vocalizations, including high amplitude sounds that reduce masking in noisy environments, may impose energetic costs that reduce fitness. Because of the reproductive trade-offs and other stresses they impose on some birds, noisy habitats may represent ecological traps, habitats in which individuals have reduced fitness yet are colonized at rates greater than or equal to other habitats.

Anthropophony may ultimately have population- or community-level impacts on avian fauna. One study focusing on community composition found that habitats exposed to anthropophony hosted fewer bird species than regions without noise, but both areas had similar numbers of nests. In fact, nests in noisy habitats had higher survival than those laid in control habitats, presumably because noisy environments hosted fewer western scrub jays which are major nest predators of other birds. Thus, anthropophony can have negative effects on local species diversity, but the species capable of coping with noise disturbance may actually benefit from the exclusion of negative species interactions in those areas. Other experiments suggest that noise pollution has the potential to affect avian mating systems by altering the strength of pair bonds. When exposed to high amplitude environmental noise in a laboratory setting, zebra finches, a monogamous species, show a decreased preference for their mated partners. Similarly, male reed buntings in quiet environments are more likely to be part of a mated pair than males in noisy locations. Such effects may ultimately result in reduced reproductive output of birds subject to high levels of environmental noise.

== Anthropophony and insects ==
In comparison to other taxa, relatively little research has been done on the effects of anthropogenic noise on insects. However, current knowledge indicates that they are likely affected by anthropogenic noise to a greater extent than many other animal groups. Insects, like birds, rely heavily on acoustic signals for communication, which can be disrupted by noise. However, while birds and other taxa often studied for effects of anthropogenic noise primarily rely on airborne acoustic signals, insects frequently utilize vibrational signals for communication. The properties of vibrational signals increase the threat posed to them by anthropogenic noise. Furthermore, due to limited dispersal capacity and narrow habitat requirements, insects may be unable to avoid anthropogenic noise by moving to quieter locations. Certain behavioral responses could allow for insects to compensate for the presence of anthropogenic noise, but physiological and environmental constraints limit the efficacy of these strategies.

As a result of interference with communication, insects are at a greater risk of experiencing negative fitness consequences due to impacts on mating, foraging, and survival. Noise that masks or distorts signals used for mate location or courtship can prevent mating from taking place. Similarly, noise that prevents insects from perceiving prey or potential dangers may result in decreased foraging success and survival.

=== Mechanism of impact ===
Vibrational signals used by most insects have the majority of their power concentrated below 2kHz, a frequency range that is lower than most airborne communication but has high overlap with many types of anthropogenic noise. As a result, anthropogenic noise can mask and/or distort the properties of vibrational signals. Noise that overlaps acoustic signals can prevent insects from identifying intraspecific courtship signals, discerning the meaning of signals, and perceiving signals made by predator or prey species. Any reduced ability to recognize and locate mates, avoid predation and other dangers, or forage for food is likely to have negative consequences for survival and reproduction.

=== Responses to noise ===
Insects display a variety of responses to noise, such as shifting signal frequency or rate to reduce overlap with noise and altering signal timing to take advantage of noise gaps. The efficacy of these responses varies depending on insects' ability to plastically modulate their behavior or signals, as well as the characteristics of the anthropogenic noise.

Some insects can modulate the frequencies of their signals, shifting them higher or lower to avoid overlap with other noise. For example, male Chorthippus biguttulus grasshoppers, which use airborne signals, produce higher frequency signals when living by roads to avoid overlap with low frequency traffic noise. Similarly, female Nezara viridula stinkbugs, which use vibrational signals, alter the dominant frequency of their calling song to avoid overlap and interference by vibratory disturbances. The ability of an insect species to modulate signals is constrained by physiological limits to the range of frequencies they are capable of producing. Additionally, numerous anthropogenic noises occupy a wide range of frequencies that may exceed the frequency range that insects can produce.

Insects may alter the timing or structure of their signals to avoid overlap with noise by changing the rate of signal production, the pacing of signal components, or the length of signal components. Thermals constraints on signal rates and timing can limit the ability to modulate signal behavior to seasons or times of day when the temperature is within an optimal range.

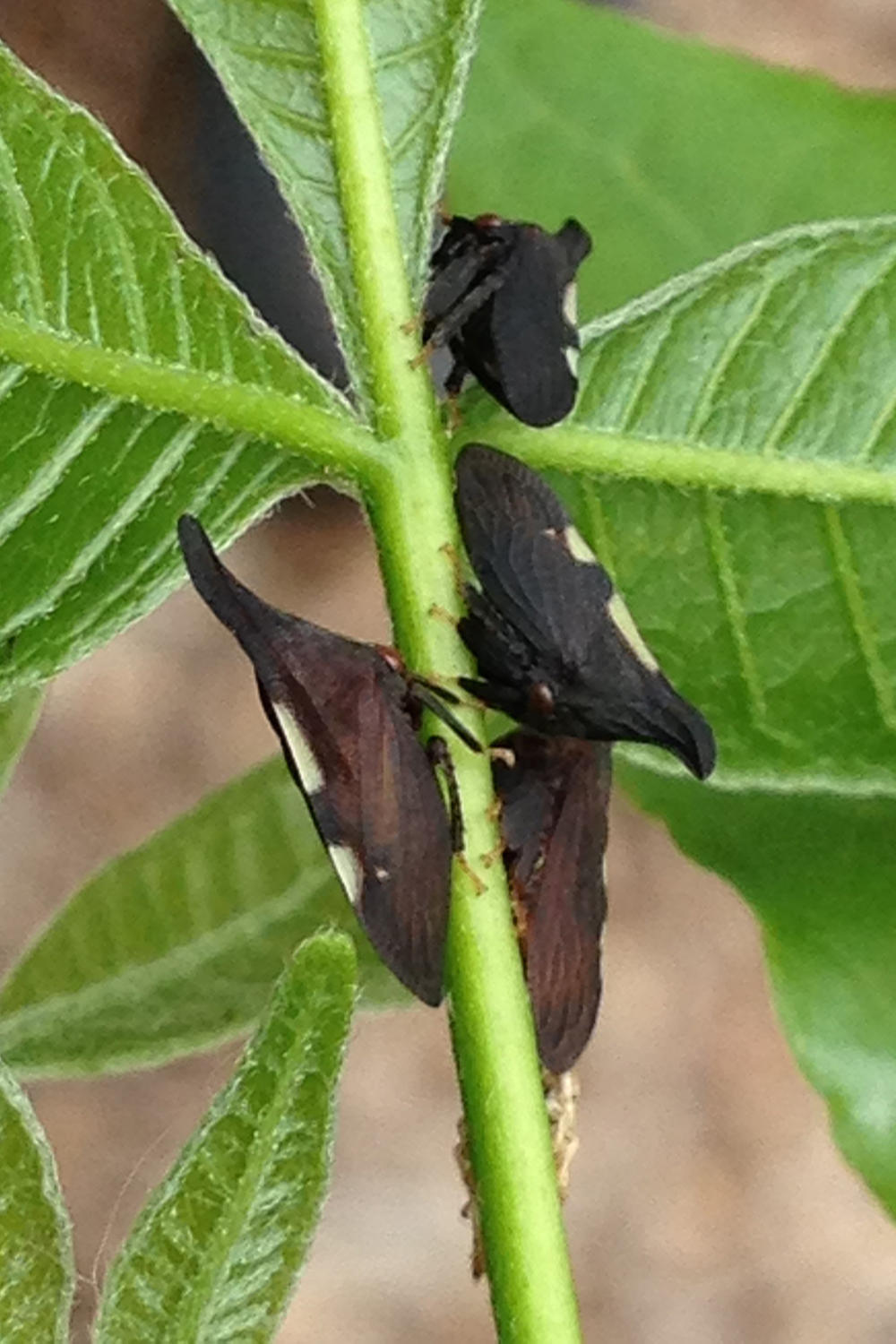
Enchenopa binotata treehoppers respond to noise by identifying and signaling within gaps of noise.

Insects can also alter their behavior in response to noise by signaling within "gaps" of anthropogenic noise, during which there is less noise and less risk of being overlap. This response is dependent on both the ability to quickly perceive a noise gap and then to initiate a signal. Insect species that utilize this technique include the treehopper Enchenopa Binotata and katydid Copiphora brevirostris, both of which identify gaps in wind noise to initiate signaling during short quiet periods. In environments when anthropogenic noise is constant, such as gas fields and wind farms, this behavioral modification likely is not a potential option for insects.

=== Fitness consequences ===
Interference from anthropogenic noise on insect communication can affect mating, foraging, and survival. Disruption of mating by noise masking occurs when noise overlap reduces perception of signals and insects are unable to modulate signaling to avoid it. This can hinder species recognition and mate location, and may preclude courtship and mating altogether. Decreased mating has been observed in multiple species as a result of interfering noise, including Schizocosa ocreata wolf spiders, Graminella nigrifrons leafhoppers, and Dendroctonus pine beetles. Even if insects can alter signaling behavior, they still might suffer reductions in fitness if females do not recognize the altered signals or respond to them as readily as non-altered signals. Under noisy conditions, females may also choose to mate with the first male encountered rather than sampling and comparing between males.

Noise can also affect interactions among species. When noise masks airborne or vibrational signals made by prey, insects that rely on these cues to locate prey may be unable to, or prey species may alter their behavior to compensate for the noise. These changes can reduce foraging success, thus constraining growth and limiting reproduction. Alternatively, insects that utilize warning signals or that detect potential dangers through predator vibrations may be unable to do so, leading to increased predation rates.

=== Ecological impacts ===
While there is little research on community or ecosystem level impacts of anthropogenic noise on insects, studies indicate that noise can decrease the diversity and abundance of insect communities. Potential consequences of these shifts may lead to cascading effects on higher levels of the food chain, reduced ecological resilience, and the provision of critical ecosystem services such as pollination.

== Soundscape conservation ==
The discipline of conservation biology has traditionally been concerned with the preservation of biodiversity and the habitats that organisms are dependent upon. However, soundscape ecology encourages biologists to consider natural soundscapes as resources worthy of conservation efforts. Soundscapes that come from relatively untrammeled habitats have value for wildlife as demonstrated by the numerous negative effects of anthropogenic noise on various species. Organisms that use acoustic cues generated by their prey may be particularly impacted by human-altered soundscapes. In this situation, the (unintentional) senders of the acoustic signals will have no incentive to compensate for masking imposed by anthropogenic sound. In addition, natural soundscapes can have benefits for human wellbeing and may help generate a distinct sense of place, connecting people to the environment and providing unique aesthetic experiences. Because of the various values inherent in natural soundscapes, they may be considered ecosystem services that are provisioned by intact, functioning ecosystems. Targets for soundscape conservation may include soundscapes necessary for the persistence of threatened wildlife, soundscapes that are themselves being severely altered by anthrophony, and soundscapes that represent unique places or cultural values. Some governments and management agencies have begun to consider preservation of natural soundscapes as an environmental priority. In the United States, the National Park Service's Natural Sounds and Night Skies Division is working to protect natural and cultural soundscapes.

== See also ==
- Acoustic ecology – Study of human and environmental sounds
- Aphonia – Medical condition leading to loss of voice
- Bioacoustics – Study of sound relating to biology
- Ecoacoustics – Study of the effect of environmental sound on organisms
- Human auditory ecology
- Silent Spring – Book by Rachel Carson about pesticides harming the environment
- Soundscape – Audible characteristics, resonances of an acoustic environment
- Spectrogram – Visual representation of the spectrum of frequencies of a signal as it varies with time
- Zoomusicology – Field of musicology and zoology that studies the music of animals
