= World Soundscape Project =

International research project

The World Soundscape Project (WSP) was an international research project founded by Canadian composer R. Murray Schafer in the late 1960s at Simon Fraser University. The project initiated the modern study of acoustic ecology. Its ultimate goal is "to find solutions for an ecologically balanced soundscape where the relationship between the human community and its sonic environment is in harmony." The practical manifestations of this goal include education about the soundscape and noise pollution, in addition to the recording and cataloguing of international soundscapes with a focus on preservation of soundmarks and dying sounds and sound environments. Publications which emerged from the project include The Book of Noise (1968) and The Tuning of the World (1977), both by Schafer, as well as the Handbook for Acoustic Ecology (1978) by Barry Truax. The project has thus far resulted in two major tours, in Canada and Europe, the results of which comprise the World Soundscape Library. Notable members included John Oswald, Howard Broomfield, Bruce Davis, Peter Huse, Barry Truax and Hildegard Westerkamp.

== Early history – The Vancouver Soundscape ==
The project emerged from Schafer's reaction to the increasing degradation of Vancouver's developing soundscape, as well as work as a professor at Simon Fraser University where he taught a course in noise pollution in attempt to draw attention to the sonic environment. The project quickly attracted a small group of young composers and communications students, and after receiving support from the Donner Canadian Foundation it began its first project in 1972: a detailed study of the soundscape of Vancouver. The study resulted in a recording, The Vancouver Soundscape which was published in 1973. It consisted of phonographical recordings of local soundscapes and soundmarks as well as a spoken documentary recording by R. Murray Schafer discussing notions of acoustic design, providing analysis of examples of good and bad acoustic design in Vancouver, illustrated with further recordings. This recording is notable for its phonographic approach and is distinct from later WSP recordings in that it features no on-site narration. However, some of the recordings do bear the beginnings of more compositional approaches to soundscape recording, evidenced particularly in the track, 'Entrance to the Harbour' in which a 30-minute boat journey is condensed into a 7-minute montage in an effort to highlight the important sound events. The recordists of this publication were Howard Broomfield, Bruce Davis, Peter Huse and Colin Miles.

== Soundscapes of Canada ==
Following the success of The Vancouver Soundscape, two members, Peter Huse and Bruce Davis, embarked on a tour across Canada in 1973, in an effort to document the changing soundscape and preserve dying sounds becoming obsolete due to new technology. The types of sounds recorded on this project included natural ambiences, signifiers such as bells, chimes and foghorns, as well as mechanical and industrial sounds. The recordings are typically long uninterrupted takes and do not attempt to mask the presence of the recordists. Much of the recordings consist of Huse and Davis asking for directions or interacting with the people they encounter in the sound environments they documented. This approach of transparency marks a shift in aesthetic from the previous venture. The recordings were mixed into a documentary radio series on CBC Ideas called Soundscapes of Canada. The series consisted of ten one-hour programmes which were broadcast in 1974.

== Five Village Soundscapes ==
In 1975, a larger group of members, including Schafer, embarked on a tour of Europe. The tour included workshops and lectures in several major cities, spreading the educational and theoretical aspects of the Project, as well as detailed analysis and recording projects of five European Villages, one of each in Sweden (Skruv), Germany (Bissingen, Baden-Württemberg), Italy (Cembra), France (Lesconil) and Scotland (Dollar).

The recording projects were similar in style and purpose to the Canadian tour, but with special focus on rural areas and soundscapes which were still well-preserved. The tour also resulted in two publications, a narrative account of the trip called European Sound Diary and a detailed soundscape analysis called Five Village Soundscapes.

In 2009, a group of Finnish researchers led by Helmi Järviluoma, Heikki Uimonen, and Noora Vikman in collaboration with Barry Truax revisited the same five villages to analyze how their soundscapes had changed over 30 years due to urbanization.

== Soundscape Vancouver 1996 ==
The project slowed down during the 1980s and direct activity by the original members under the WSP banner dwindled. However, the aftereffects left by their work in the 1970s helped Acoustic Ecology emerge internationally as a field of study and the methodologies of the World Soundscape Project served as the basis or inspiration for subsequent international endeavours.

In the 1990s, the project reemerged with the digitization of much of the recordings library onto the DAT format, and new digital recordings made in Vancouver. These recordings formed the basis of the Soundscape Vancouver '96 project which culminated in a publication intended to revisit the Vancouver Soundscape project of 1973. Instead of phonographic recordings this release was compositionally oriented, with the recordings used as source material for soundscape compositions by a host of prominent international electroacoustic composers. Featured composers included Darren Copeland, Sabine Breitsameter, Hans Ulrich Werner, Barry Truax and Claude Schryer. It also featured one track of phonographic ambience and a narrated documentary by Barry Truax and Hildegard Westerkamp similar to the final track on the 1973 publication by R. Murray Schafer. It was released as a double-CD with the original 1973 project.

== Present day ==
The entire library has been digitized and a new project has begun to bring its contents online for student access. The online catalogue has been updated to include photographs from many of the recording sites. While the project has not embarked on any recent studies or tours, its impact on the international acoustic ecology community has been dramatic and there are many groups in different countries now devoted to similar projects inspired by the efforts of the World Soundscape Project. In 1993, the members of the international acoustic ecology community, including important contributors to the World Soundscape Project, formed the World Forum for Acoustic Ecology.

== Published work ==
- The New Soundscape
- 1970: The Book of Noise
- 1972: A Survey of Community Noise By-Laws in Canada
- 1972: The Music of the Environment
- 1973: The Vancouver Soundscape
- 1978: European Sound Diary
- 1978: Five Village Soundscapes
- 1996: The Vancouver Soundscape
- 1999: Handbook for Acoustic Ecology

== See also ==
- Sound studies
