= Bernie Krause =

American musician (born 1938)

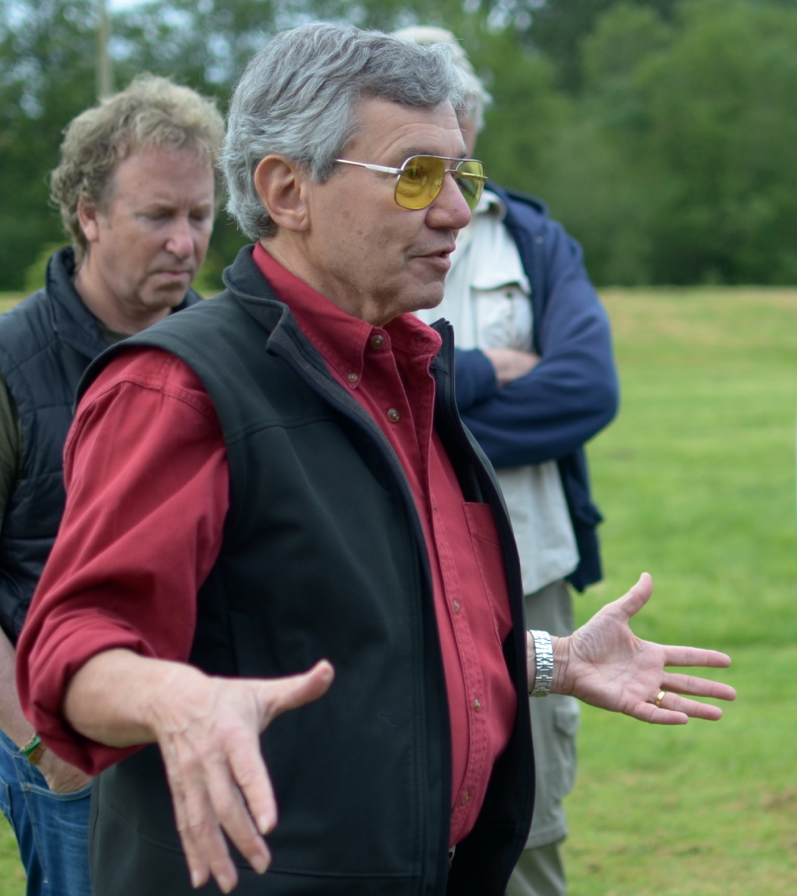
- Krause in 2013

Background information
- Born: Bernard L. Krause; December 8, 1938 (age 87); Detroit, Michigan, U.S.
- Occupations: Musician, author, soundscape ecologist, bio-acoustician, speaker
- Years active: 1957–present

Bernard L. Krause (born December 8, 1938) is an American musician and soundscape ecologist. In 1968, he founded Wild Sanctuary, an organization dedicated to the recording and archiving of natural soundscapes. Krause is an author, a bio-acoustician, a speaker, and natural sound artist who coined the terms geophony, biophony, and anthropophony.

== Biography ==
Krause was born in Detroit, Michigan. From 1957, he worked as a recording engineer and producer in Ann Arbor while an undergraduate student. Krause joined The Weavers in 1963, occupying the tenor position originated by co-founder Pete Seeger until they disbanded in early 1964.

=== Electronic music ===
Krause moved to the San Francisco Bay Area to study electronic music at Mills College. During this period Krause met Paul Beaver and together they formed Beaver & Krause. They also served as the Moog company's sales representatives on the U.S. West Coast. As such, they were able to exploit the growing fascination in the new synthesizer sounds among rock and pop musicians, an interest that was partly influenced by these artists' consumption of hallucinogenic drugs, and the increasingly generous advances they received from their record companies. In June 1967, Beaver & Krause set up a stall at the Monterey Pop Festival, where they introduced the Moog III to the musicians and attendees at the festival.

The team played Moog synthesizer on the Monkees' song "Star Collector" (1967), one of the first pop group recordings to feature synthesizer. In 1967 they released The Nonesuch Guide to Electronic Music. It was the first West Coast recording to utilize Dolby A301 (without meters) noise reduction as an inherent part of their production. Beaver & Krause, individually or as a team, went on to sell Moog IIIs to musicians and perform on their recordings with the instrument. In November 1968 Krause was asked by George Harrison to demonstrate the synthesizer after performing on a session for Apple artist Jackie Lomax in Los Angeles. According to Krause, without his knowledge, permission, or compensation, Harrison made a recording of the demonstration and issued an unauthorized version as "No Time Or Space" on his Electronic Sound album the following year. Because of their studio work in Hollywood, New York City, and London, Beaver & Krause are credited with helping to introduce the synthesizer to pop music and film.

=== Soundscape recording ===
Since 1979, Krause has concentrated on the recording and archiving of wild natural soundscapes from around the world. These recordings – works of art and science commissioned primarily by museums, aquaria, and zoos for their dioramas and sound installations worldwide – have been mixed into ambient tracks for numerous feature films, and downloadable field recording albums from the world's rare habitats. In 1981, he earned his PhD in Creative Sound Arts, with an internship in marine bioacoustics from Union Institute and University.

In 1985 Krause, with colleague, Diana Reiss, helped lure Humphrey the Whale, a migrating male humpback that had wandered into Sacramento River Delta and apparently got lost, back to the Pacific Ocean. As scientific co-directors of the operation, they used recordings of humpbacks feeding, recorded by two graduate students from the University of Hawaii, recordings that Krause modified to eliminate extraneous noise and add different characteristics to the audio tracks so that the whale would not habituate to the one audio short example that was provided by the students' graduate professor.

Krause's 1988 CD album, Gorillas in the Mix (Rykodisc), is composed entirely from sampled animal sounds, played from sampling keyboards.

Working in the field of soundscape ecology, a sub-category of ecoacoustics, Krause introduced a number of terms and concepts into the discipline to further define the sources of sound within the soundscape. They include geophony, the first sounds heard on earth consisting of non-biological natural sounds such as the effect of wind in trees or grasses, waves at the ocean or lakeshore, or movement of the earth. The second acoustic source is called biophony, the collective signature produced at one time by all sound-producing organisms in a given habitat. The third, and last of these elements is referred to as anthropophony, or human-generated acoustic signatures. In the final category, some sources represent controlled sound, such as music, theatre, or language. While a large percentage consists of incoherent or chaotic sound, referred to as noise. The first and last terms were implemented along with his late colleague, Stuart Gage, Professor Emeritus, Michigan State University.

Krause was invited to present a TED Global talk at the 2013 Edinburgh conference and the keynote talk at the first conference of the International Society of Ecoacoustics (ISE), a worldwide organization, meeting in Paris in June, 2014.

In July 2014, the Cheltenham Music Festival premiered "The Great Animal Orchestra: Symphony for Orchestra and Wild Soundscapes," a collaboration with friend and colleague, Richard Blackford, former Balliol College Oxford Composer-in-Residence. Performed by the BBC National Orchestra of Wales and conducted by Martyn Brabbins, the theme is based on Krause's 2012 book of the same title. The work integrates natural soundscapes into the orchestral textures of a major symphonic piece. The symphony was recorded and released on CD by Nimbus Records in September 2014.

On April 3, 2015, Krause and Blackford premiered the score for their first ballet, "Biophony", performed by Alonzo King LINES Ballet at the Yerba Buena Center for the Arts in San Francisco. His most recent two books, published by Yale University Press, are titled Voices of the Wild: Animal Songs, Human Din, and the Call to Save Natural Soundscapes, and "Wild Soundscapes: Discovering the Voice of the Natural World". In September, 2021, "The Power of Tranquility in a Very Noisy World,"

On July 1, 2016, the Fondation Cartier pour l'art contemporain in Paris opened the first major natural soundscape exhibit in a contemporary art museum. Based on his book, "The Great Animal Orchestra," the sound sculpture serves as an early retrospective of Krause's work and includes many examples of his collection along with supporting graphic and visual media. The visual elements were generated by the London-based organization, United Visual Artists (UVA). The exhibit ran until 7 January 2017 and opened as part of a larger Fondation Cartier collection at the Seoul Museum of Art in May, 2017. The Great Animal Orchestra art piece has subsequently been shown at Shanghai's Power Station of Art, 2018, and at the 180 The Strand Gallery, London in 2019. In the fall of 2021, the exhibit was featured at the Peabody Essex Museum, Salem, Massachusetts. In the spring of 2022, the work opened at the 23rd Biennale in Sydney, Australia, and also Lille, France at the same time. Its West Coast premiere occurred in June, 2023 at San Francisco's Exploratorium.

== Personal life ==
Krause and his wife, Katherine, live in Sonoma, California.

The Krauses' home, with his archives, equipment, and all of their personal possessions was destroyed in a wildfire on 11 October 2017. His audio recordings, though, were backed up off-site.

== Discography ==
- 1967 Beaver & Krause – The Nonesuch Guide to Electronic Music (Nonesuch Records) (Revised and repackaged with new material by Bernie Krause in 1980)
- 1968 Beaver & Krause – Ragnarok – Electronic Funk (Limelight Records)
- 1970 Beaver & Krause – In a Wild Sanctuary (Warner Bros. Records)
- 1971 Beaver & Krause – Gandharva (featuring Mike Bloomfield, Ray Brown, Gerry Mulligan, Gail Laughton, Ronnie Montrose, Howard Roberts, Bud Shank and others) (Warner Bros. Records)
- 1972 Beaver & Krause – All Good Men (Warner Bros. Records)
- 1975 Bernie Krause – Citadels of Mystery (Takoma Records/Chrysalis Records)
- 1981 Bernard Krause – The New Nonesuch Guide to Electronic Music (Nonesuch)
- 1986 Bernie Krause – Equator (The Nature Company)
- 1987 Bernie Krause – Nature (The Nature Company)
- 1988 Bernie Krause – Distant Thunder (The Nature Company)
- 1988 Bernie Krause – Mountain Stream (The Nature Company)
- 1988 Bernie Krause – Gentle Ocean (The Nature Company)
- 1988 Bernie Krause – Morning Songbirds (The Nature Company)
- 1988 Bernie Krause – Sounds of a Summer's Evening (The Nature Company)
- 1988 Bernie Krause – Jungle Shoes/Fish Wrap (CD Single, Rykodisc)
- 1988 Bernie Krause & Human Remains – Gorillas in the Mix (Rykodisc)
- 1989 Bernie Krause & Philip Aaberg – Meridian (The Nature Company)
- 1989 Bernie Krause – Tropical Jungle (The Nature Company)
- 1989 Bernie Krause – Gorilla (Wild Sanctuary)
- 1990 Bernie Krause – Natural Voices/African Song Cycle (Wild Sanctuary)
- 1990 Bernie Krause – Green Meadow Stream (North Sound)
- 1990 Bernie Krause – Woodland Journey (Wild Sanctuary)
- 1990 Bernie Krause – Dawn at Trout Lake (North Sound)
- 1990 Bernie Krause – Amazon Days Amazon Nights (North Sound)
- 1991 Bernie Krause – Ocean Wonders (North Sound)
- 1991 Bernie Krause – Tropical Thunder: A Rainstorm in Borneo (Wild Sanctuary)
- 1991 Ruth Happel with Bernie Krause – Loons of Echo Pond (Wild Sanctuary)
- 1991 Bernie Krause, Bob Dorough, Janis Lawrence & Jeff Kohler – Wild Times at the Water Hole (Creatures 'n' Kids)
- 1991 Bernie Krause - Arctic Summer
- 1993 Bernie Krause - Songs of the Whales & Dolphins (The Nature Company)
- 1994 Bernie Krause – Mata Atlantica: A Rare Brazilian Rain Forest (North Sound)
- 1994 Bernie Krause & Ruth Happel – Desert Solitudes (North Sound)
- 1994 Bernie Krause – Ocean Dreams (North Sound)
- 1994 Bernie Krause – Midsummer Nights (North Sound)
- 1994 Bernie Krause – Nature's Lullabyes: Ocean/Rain/Stream (Wild Sanctuary)
- 1994 Bernie Krause – African Adventures (North Sound)
- 1994 Bernie Krause & Philip Aaberg – A Wild Christmas (Wild Sanctuary)
- 1994 Bernie Krause – Whales, Wolves & Eagles of Glacier Bay (North Sound)
- 1995 Bernie Krause & Louis Sarno – Bayaka (Ellipsis Arts)
- 1995 Bernie Krause & Rodney Franklin – Rhythms of Africa (Miramar Records)
- 1995 Bernie Krause & Rodney Franklin – Ocean Odyssey (Miramar Records)
- 1995 Bernie Krause & Rodney Franklin – Rain Forest Dreams (Miramar Records)
- 1996 Bernie Krause - Notes from the Wild (bonus disc with the book of the same title)
- 1998 Bernie Krause – Kalimantaan: Heaven Before Time (Miramar Records)
- 1998 Bernie Krause – Zimbabwe: Gardens of Eden (Miramar Records)
- 2002 Bernie Krause – African Safari: Zimbabwe (Wild Sanctuary)
- 2002 Bernie Krause – Alpine Meadow (Wild Sanctuary)
- 2002 Bernie Krause – Autumn Day in Yellowstone (Wild Sanctuary)
- 2002 Bernie Krause – Carolina Woods (Wild Sanctuary)
- 2002 Bernie Krause – Costa Rica: Hidden Treasures (Wild Sanctuary)
- 2002 Bernie Krause – Galapagos (Wild Sanctuary)
- 2002 Bernie Krause & Lang Elliott – Prairie Winds (Wild Sanctuary)
- 2002 Bernie Krause & Jack Hines – Sequoia High Country (Wild Sanctuary)
- 2002 Bernie Krause – Sonoma Valley Sunrise (Wild Sanctuary)
- 2002 Bernie Krause – Spring in Corkscrew Swamp (Wild Sanctuary)
- 2002 Bernie Krause – Sumatra Days, Sumatra Nights (Wild Sanctuary)
- 2002 Bernie Krause – Winds Across the Tundra (Wild Sanctuary)
- 2002 Bernie Krause - Wild Soundscapes (bonus disc with book of the same title)
- 2005 Country Joe McDonald with Bernie Krause - Natural Imperfections (Rag Baby 1037)
- 2006 Bernie Krause, Kevin Colver & Martin Stewart – Voice of the Arctic Refuge (Wild Sanctuary)
- 2014 Bernie Krause and Richard Blackford - The Great Animal Orchestra: Symphony for Orchestra and Wild Soundscapes, Nimbus Records

== Honours ==
Chevalier de l'ordre des Arts et des Lettres, July, 2022.

== Bibliography ==
- "An exploration of ecoacoustics and its applications in conservation ecology," A. Farina a,*, B. Krause b, T.C. Mullet c., Elsiver, BioSystems 245 105296, Sept., 2024
- "Using ecoacoustic methods to survey the impacts of climate change on biodiversity", Bernie Krause, Almo Farina, Biological Conservation, 195 (2016) 245–254, Jan. 2016
- "The Niche Hypothesis: New Thoughts on Creature Vocalizations and the Relationship Between Natural Sound and Music" WFAE Newsletter, June, 1993
- Notes From the Wild: The Nature Recording Expeditions of Bernie Krause with companion CD (Ellipsis Arts, 1996, ISBN 1-55961-385-8)
- Into A Wild Sanctuary: A Life in Music & Natural Sound with companion CD (Heyday Books, 1998, ISBN 1-890771-11-2)
- Wild Soundscapes: Discovering the Voice of the Natural World with companion CD (Yale University Press, 2016, ISBN 978-0-300-21819-0)
- "Anatomy of a Soundscape: Evolving Perspectives," J. Audio Eng. Soc., Vol. 56, No. 1/2, 2008 January/February
- The Great Animal Orchestra: Finding the Origins of Music in the World's Wild Places, Little Brown, published March 2012 (ISBN 0-316-08687-8).
- "Voices of the Wild: Animal Songs, Human Din, and the Call to Save Natural Soundscapes," (Yale University Press, 2015, ISBN 978-0-300-20631-9)
- "Soundscape Ecology: The Science of Sound in the Landscape," Bryan C. Pijanowski, Luis J. Villanueva-Rivera, Sarah L. Dumyahn, Almo Farina, Bernie L. Krause, Brian M. Napoletano, Stuart H. Gage, and Nadia Pieretti, www.biosciencemag.org March 2011 / Vol. 61 No. 3 BioScience, 203-216, (ISSN 0006-3568 print, ISSN 1525-3244 online)
- Krause, Bernie, Gage, Stuart H., Joo Wooyeong, "Measuring and interpreting the temporal variability in the soundscape at four places in Sequoia National Park," Landscape Ecology, ISSN 0921-2973, Landscape Ecol, DOI 10.1007/s10980-011-9639-6
- Krause, Bernie, "Bioacoustics: Habitat ambience and ecological balance," (Whole Earth Review, No. 57, Winter, 1987, ISSN 0749-5056)
