= Barry Truax =

Canadian composer (born 1947)

- Born: 10 May 1947 (age 79)
- Origin: Canada
- Occupations: Composer of electroacoustic music, Writer, and Teacher

Barry Douglas Truax CM (born 10 May 1947) is a Canadian composer of electroacoustic music, a writer, and a teacher. He is best known for his association with the World Soundscape Project at Simon Fraser University (SFU) and his development of granular synthesis using sampled sounds to create multi-channel soundscape compositions, such as Riverrun (1986) and Wings of Nike (1987). He is also known for his books Acoustic Communication (1984, 2001) and the Handbook for Acoustic Ecology (1978, 1999). He is the only Canadian recipient of the Magisterium award at the International Competition of Electroacoustic Music, Bourges, France, in 1991. He is a professor emeritus at Simon Fraser University (SFU). In June 2025, SFU awarded him an honorary Doctorate of Fine Arts.

== Biography ==
Barry Truax was born in Chatham, Ontario. He obtained a Bachelor of Science degree in physics and mathematics from Queen's University in 1969, and a Master of Music degree from the University of British Columbia in 1971. His academic path further led him to the Institute of Sonology at Utrecht University from 1971 to 1973, where he studied electronic and computer composition under the guidance of Gottfried Michael Koenig and Otto Laske. During this period, he created the POD system of interactive composition with digital synthesis, including FM (Frequency Modulation) synthesis that he learned from its initial creator John Chowning. In 1977 his Sonic Landscape No. 3 won first prize in the computer music category of the Fifth International Competition of Electroacoustic Music in Bourges.

His career encompasses a wide spectrum of activities, including musical composition, the study of acoustic ecology, academic publications and advancements in sound technology. For most of his career, Truax was associated with Simon Fraser University, where he now holds the title of Professor Emeritus.

In 1973, R. Murray Schafer invited Truax to join the World Soundscape Project (WSP) at Simon Fraser University. The WSP, initiated by Schafer, focused on the emerging field of acoustic ecology, aiming to increase public awareness about the sonic environment and address the growing issue of noise pollution. Truax initially served as a research assistant and later took on the role of director for the project following Schafer’s departure from SFU in 1975. During this period, he edited the Handbook for Acoustic Ecology, first published in 1978. This reference work compiled essential terminology from the fields of acoustics, psychoacoustics, electroacoustics and soundscape studies, providing a scientific foundation for the developing discipline. The Handbook was later released in various formats, including a CD-ROM edition in 1999 and an online version, making it widely accessible to researchers and students.

Truax and Schafer defined the term soundscape as how that environment is perceived and understood by those living within it. Truax’s broader contributions to acoustic ecology include the development of theoretical frameworks for understanding the relationship between humans and their sonic environments. The project provided a framework for him to integrate his scientific and musical backgrounds to explore the complexities of the sonic environment.

=== Compositional work ===
Truax is known for his development of real-time granular synthesis, a technique that involves the creation and manipulation of up to thousands of extremely short sound grains, typically lasting between 10 and 50 milliseconds. In 1986, he developed the GSX computer music system at SFU, which enabled the first real-time implementation of this technique as used in his composition Riverrun (1986). Inspired by the opening word of James Joyce's Finnegans Wake, Riverrun utilizes thousands of minute sound droplets to construct a dense and constantly evolving sonic texture, metaphorically representing the flow of a river. It was awarded the Magisterium prize at the International Competition of Electroacoustic Music in Bourges in 1991 and was included as one of 10 significant works in the Oxford publication Inside Computer Music. Other compositions by Truax that feature granular synthesis include Wings of Nike (1987) and Tongues of Angels (1988).

Truax's approach to soundscape composition is characterized by the creative use of recognizable environmental sounds to evoke specific associations, memories, and imaginative responses in the listener. He operates under a philosophy of context-based creation, where the environmental context of the sounds is intentionally preserved, enhanced, and exploited by the composer. His compositional techniques exist on a continuum, ranging from found sound compositions that remain very close to the original recorded environment to more abstracted works that involve significant transformations of these recordings. Pacific Fanfare (1996) is composed of sound signals from Vancouver. Pendlerdrøm (1997) evokes a commuter’s train journeys including daydreams. La Sera di Benevento (1999) represents a soundwalk in the Italian city of the title. Dominion (1991) involves 12 instrumentalists combined with recordings of Canadian soundmarks from coast to coast. The title track of his Islands CD, Island (2000), depicts a sonic journey to a magical realm. All of these works are published on his Cambridge Street label which he founded in 1985.

Other soundscape compositions created with his PODX system include Pacific (1990) which explores environmental sounds from the Pacific region time-stretched through granulation techniques; Basilica (1992) which stretches the sounds of Quebec City's Notre-Dame de Québec bells; Temple (2002) which utilizes convolution to incorporate spatial characteristics of a church; as well as Chalice Well (2009), Aeolian Voices (2013), and Earth & Steel (2013) which create immersive virtual soundscapes based on terrestrial elements. Truax employs a variety of both analog and digital studio techniques to transform environmental sounds, often layering them in both stereo and octophonic formats to create immersive sonic environments. Time compression is another technique, as used in The Bells of Salzburg (2018) and Rainforest Raven (2020).

In works like Song of Songs (1992), and Steam (2001) he integrates narrative elements and live instruments with soundscape material. Finally, some of his works explore more abstracted perspectives on the soundscape, such as What The Waters Told Me (2022), How The Winds Caressed Me (2023), and When The Earth Mourned For Me (2024). By validating environmental sound as a musical element, Truax and his colleagues at SFU such as Hildegard Westerkamp broadened the horizons of electroacoustic music and encouraged a more ecologically conscious approach to sound art.

Beyond traditional concert settings, Truax has also created multimedia works such as the opera Powers of Two (1998/2004) which integrates singers, dancers, and an eight-channel soundtrack to explore themes of psychological, spiritual, and sexual unity. He has also created other works that incorporate computer graphics and video, including Divan, Wings of Nike, Song of Songs ,, and Night of the Conjurer in collaboration with Theo Goldberg. His music theatre work Androgyne, Mon Amour combines a double bass player with a soundtrack based on selected poems by Tennessee Williams.

=== Academic career ===
Barry Truax's academic career at Simon Fraser University began in 1973 and spanned several decades until his retirement in 2015. He held positions in both the School of Communication and the School for the Contemporary Arts where he helped establish the Music program and taught courses in acoustic communication and electroacoustic composition, with a specialization in soundscape composition. Truax supervised numerous students and other composers, such as Hildegard Westerkamp, Paul Dolden, and Arne Eigenfeldt.

In 1999 he received the Award for Teaching Excellence from Simon Fraser University. After his retirement, Truax served as the Edgard Varèse Guest Professor at the Technical University, Berlin (2015–16) and as a guest composer at the BEAST Festival in Birmingham (2016). He also taught online webinar courses in sound and audio, as well as soundscape composition.

He is a founding member of the International Confederation of Electroacoustic Music, the World Forum for Acoustic Ecology, and the Canadian Electroacoustic Community to which he was appointed Patron in 2024. In 1985, he established the Cambridge Street record label, which specializes in computer and electronic music, and hosted the 1985 International Computer Music Conference in Vancouver. He and his partner, Dr. Guenther Krueger, also established Glenfraser Endowments at both SFU and Concordia University, Montreal to support students in sound studies and electroacoustic composition.

He was made a Member of the Order of Canada on December 31, 2025.

== Selected works ==
Compositions

=== Works for instruments and/or voice and soundtracks ===
Aerial, 1979, solo horn and four soundtracks

Bamboo, Silk and Stone, 1994, Asian instruments and two soundtracks [co-composed with Randy Raine-Reusch]

Dominion, 1991, chamber ensemble and two soundtracks

East Wind, 1981, amplified recorder and four soundtracks

From the Unseen World, 2012, piano and six soundtracks

Inside, 1995, bass oboe and two soundtracks

Love Songs, 1979, solo female voice and four soundtracks; Text: Norbert Ruebsaat

Nautilus, 1976, solo percussion and four soundtracks

Nightwatch, 1982, solo marimba and four soundtracks

Patterns, 1996, female speaker and two soundtracks

She, a Solo, 1973, mezzo-soprano and tape

Sonic Landscape No. 4, 1977, organ and four soundtracks

Steam, 2001, alto flute and two soundtracks

Tongues of Angels,1988, oboe d'amore, English horn and four soundtracks

Twin Souls, 1997, chamber choir and two soundtracks

The Way of the Spirit, 2005-2006, ichigenkin, shakuhachi and eight digital soundtracks [co-composed with Randy Raine-Reusch]

Wings of Fire, 1996, female cellist and two soundtracks; Text: Joy Kirstin

==== Stage works ====
Androgyne, Mon Amour, 1996–97, amplified male double bass player and two soundtracks; Text: Tennessee Williams

The Ghostly Moon, 2008, erhu, guzheng, marimba and digital soundtracks

Gilgamesh, 1972–73, narrator, singers, dancers, sopranino recorder, oboe, and four soundtracks; Libretto: William Maranda

Powers of Two, 1995-1999, an electroacoustic music opera in four acts, for six singers, two dancers, video tape and eight soundtracks; Libretto: Barry Truax

Skin & Metal, 2004, leather percussionist and digital soundtracks

Thou & I, 2003, tenor, baritone and digital soundtracks

==== Mixed media works ====
Beauty and the Beast, 1989, narrator (oboe d'amore and English horn), computer images, and two soundtracks; Graphics: Theo Goldberg

Divan, 1985, computer graphic slides and two soundtracks, graphics: Theo Goldberg

Night of the Conjurer, 1992, video tape; Video: Theo Goldberg

Pacific Dragon, 1991, computer graphic slides and four soundtracks; Graphics: Theo Goldberg

Song of Songs, 1992, oboe d'amore, English horn, two soundtracks and computer graphic images; Graphics: Theo Goldberg

Threshing (On the Mechanics of Nostalgia), 1993; Video: Thecla Schiphorst

The Wings of Nike, 1987, computer graphic slides and two or eight soundtracks; Graphics: Theo Goldberg

==== Tape solo works ====
Aeolian Voices, 2013, eight digital soundtracks

Androgyny, 1978, four computer-synthesized soundtracks

Arras, 1980, four computer-synthesized soundtracks

Ascendance, 1979, stereo electronic tape

Basilica.1992, two digital soundtracks

The Bells of Salzburg, 2018, eight digital soundtracks

The Blind Man, 1979, two-channel tape; Text: Norbert Ruebsaat

Chalice Well, 2009, eight digital soundtracks

Earth And Steel, 2013, eight digital soundtracks

Fire Spirits, 2010, eight digital soundtracks

The Garden of Sonic Delights, 2015–16, multiple soundtracks

How the Winds Caressed Me, 2023, eight digital soundtracks

Infinity Room, 2019, eight digital soundtracks

Island, 2000, eight digital soundtracks

La Sera di Benevento, 1999, two digital soundtracks

Ocean Deep, 2017, eight digital soundtracks and video

Pacific, 1990, four digital soundtracks

Pacific Fanfare, 1996, two digital soundtracks

Pendlerdrøm, 1997, eight digital soundtracks

Prospero’s Voyage, 2004, eight digital soundtracks

Rainforest Raven, 2020, eight digital soundtracks

Riverrun, 1986, four digital soundtracks; revised 8-channel version 2004

Sequence of Earlier Heaven, 1998, eight digital soundtracks

Sequence of Later Heaven, 1993, four digital soundtracks

The Shaman Ascending, 2004-2005, eight digital soundtracks

Solar Ellipse, 1984–85, four computer-synthesized soundtracks

Sonic Landscape No, 3, 1975, rev.1977, four computer-synthesized soundtracks

Tapes from Gilgamesh, 1972–73, 12 four-channel tapes

Temple, 2002, eight digital soundtracks

Wave Edge, 1983, four computer-synthesized soundtracks

What the Waters Told Me, 2022, eight digital soundtracks

When the Earth Mourned for Me, 2024, eight digital soundtracks

=== Written documents ===
==== Books ====
Acoustic Communication. Norwood, NJ: Ablex Publishing, 1984. 2nd ed., 2001. ISBN 978-0-313-00144-4

Handbook for Acoustic Ecology, No. 5, Music of the Environment Series, World Soundscape Project. Vancouver: ARC Publications, 1978 ISBN 978-0-88985-010-1; 2nd edition, CD-ROM version, Cambridge Street Publishing, 1999.

==== Book chapters ====
Re-engaging the Natural and Built Soundscape through Soundscape Composition, in Out Of Nature, Chigiana Journal of Musicological Studies, S. Caputo & C. Felici, eds. Third Series, Vol. 2, 2020. ISBN 978-88-5543-083-8

Imagining Acoustic Spaces through Listening and Acoustic Ecology, in M. Grimshaw-Aagaard, M. Walther-Hansen, and M. Knakkergaard, eds., The Oxford Handbook of Sound and Imagination, vol. 1, Oxford, 2019. doi:10.1093/oxfordhb/9780190460167.013.32

Acoustic Ecology and the World Soundscape Project, in M. Droumeva & R. Jordan, eds., Sound, Media, Ecology, Palgrave Macmillan, 2019. doi:10.1007/978-3-030-16569-7_2

Acoustic Space, Community and Virtual Soundscapes, in The Routledge Companion to Sounding Art, M. Cobussen, V. Meelberg and B. Truax (eds.), New York: Routledge, 2017. doi:10.4324/9781315770567-29

Voices in the Soundscape: From Cellphones to Soundscape Composition, in Electrified Voices: Medial, Socio-Historical and Cultural Aspects of Voice Transfer, D. Zakharine & N. Meise, eds., Göttingen: V & R Unipress, 2012. ISBN 978-3-8471-0024-9

Sonology: A Questionable Science Revisited, in Otto Laske: Navigating New Musical Horizons, J. Tabor, ed. Greenwood Press, 1999. ISBN 978-0-313-30632-7

Computer Music and Acoustic Communication: Two Emerging Interdisciplines, in Liora Salter & Alison Hearn, eds., Outside the Lines: Issues in Interdisciplinary Research, McGill-Queen's University Press, 1996. ISBN 978-1-282-85412-3

Electroacoustic Music and the Soundscape: The Inner and Outer World, in Companion to Contemporary Musical Thought, J. Paynter, R. Orton, P. Seymour and T. Howell, eds., Vol. 1, London: Routledge, 1992. ISBN 978-0-415-07224-3

Computer Music Language Design and the Composing Process, in The Language of Electroacoustic Music, S. Emmerson, ed. London: Macmillan, 1986. ISBN 978-3-7186-0364-0

==== Journal articles ====
Speech, Music, Soundscape and Listening: Interdisciplinary Explorations, Interdisciplinary Science Reviews, 279-293, 2022. doi:10.1080/03080188.2022.2035103

R. Murray Schafer (1933-2021) and the World Soundscape Project, Organised Sound 26(3), 419-421, 2021. doi:10.1017/S1355771821000509

Acoustic Sustainability in Urban Design: Lessons from the World Soundscape Project, Cities and Health, 122-126, 2019. doi:10.1080/23748834.2019.1585133

Editorial, Context-based Composition, Organised Sound, 22(1), 2017 doi:10.1017/S1355771816000285; 23(1), 2018. doi:10.1017/S1355771817000218

Paradigm Shifts and Electroacoustic Music: Some Personal Reflections, Organised Sound, 20(1), 105-110, 2015. doi:10.1017/S1355771814000491

From Epistemology to Creativity: A Personal View, Journal of Sonic Studies, no. 4, 2013. doi:10.22501/jss.266108

Sound, Listening and Place: The Aesthetic Dilemma, Organised Sound, 17(3), 193-201, 2012. doi:10.1017/S1355771811000380

Soundscape Composition as Global Music: Electroacoustic Music as Soundscape, Organised Sound, 13(2), 103-109, 2008. doi:10.1017/S1355771808000149

Homoeroticism and Electroacoustic Music: Absence and Personal Voice, Organised Sound, 8(1), 117-124, 2003. doi:10.1017/S1355771803001134

Genres and Techniques of Soundscape Composition as Developed at Simon Fraser University, Organised Sound, 7(1), 5-14, 2002. doi:10.1017/S1355771802001024

Electroacoustic Music and the Digital Future, Circuit, 13(1), 21-26, 2002. doi:10.7202/902261ar

The Aesthetics of Computer Music: A Questionable Concept Reconsidered, Organised Sound, 5(3), 119-126, 2000. doi:10.1017/S1355771800005021

Letter to a 25-year-old Electroacoustic Composer, Organised Sound, 4(3), 147-150, 1999. doi:10.1017/S1355771800003034

Composition and Diffusion: Space in Sound in Space, Organised Sound, 3(2), 141-146, 1998. doi:10.1017/S1355771898002076

Public Culture and Commercial Culture in Computer Music, Computer Music Journal, 20(4), 27-28, 1996. doi:10.2307/3680414

Soundscape, Acoustic Communication & Environmental Sound Composition, Contemporary Music Review, 15(1), 49-65, 1996. doi:10.1080/07494469608629688

Sounds and Sources in Powers of Two: Towards a Contemporary Myth, Organised Sound, 1(1), 13-21, 1996. doi:10.1017/S1355771896000131

The Inner and Outer Complexity of Music, Perspectives of New Music, 32(1), 176-193, 1994. doi:10.2307/833161

Discovering Inner Complexity: Time-Shifting and Transposition with a Real-time Granulation Technique, Computer Music Journal, 18(2), 1994, 38-48. doi:10.2307/3680442

Composing with Time-Shifted Environmental Sound, Leonardo Music Journal, 2(1), 37-40, 1992. doi:10.2307/1513207

Musical Creativity and Complexity at the Threshold of the 21st Century, Interface, 21(1), 29-42, 1992. ISSN: 03033902

Capturing Musical Knowledge in Software Systems, Interface, 20(3-4), 217-234, 1991.

ISSN: 03033902

Composing with Real-Time Granular Sound, Perspectives of New Music, 28(2), 120-134, 1990. doi:10.2307/833014

Real-Time Granular Synthesis with a Digital Signal Processor, Computer Music Journal, 12(2), 14-26, 1988. doi:10.2307/3679938

Sequence of Earlier Heaven: The Record as a Medium for the Electroacoustic Composer, Leonardo, 20(1), 1988, 25-28. doi:10.2307/1578411

The Computer Music Facility at Simon Fraser University, Computers and the Humanities, 19(4), 225-234, 1985. doi:10.1007/BF02259576

The PODX System: Interactive Compositional Software for the DMX-1000, Computer Music Journal, 9(1), 1985. ISSN 0148-9267

Timbral Construction in Arras as a Stochastic Process, Computer Music Journal, 6(3), 1982. doi:10.2307/3680200

The Inverse Relation between Generality and Strength in Computer Music Programs, Interface, 9(1), 1980. ISSN: 03033902

Organizational Techniques for C:M Ratios in Frequency Modulation, Computer Music Journal, 1(4), 39-45,1978. ISSN 0148-9267; reprinted in Foundations of Computer Music, C. Roads and J. Strawn (eds.). MIT Press, 1985. ISBN 978-0-262-18114-3

Computer Music Composition: The Polyphonic POD System, IEEE Computer, 11(8), 1978, 40-50. doi:10.1109/C-M.1978.218310

The Soundscape and Technology, Interface, 6, 1977, 1-8. ISSN: 03033902

The POD System of Interactive Composition Programs, Computer Music Journal, 1(3), 30-39, 1977. doi:10.2307/3679607

A Communicational Approach to Computer Sound Programs, Journal of Music Theory, 20(2), 227-300, 1976. ISSN 0022-2909

Some Programs for Real-time Computer Synthesis and Composition, Interface, 2, 1973. ISSN: 03033902

==== Recordings ====
Digital Soundscapes (Cambridge Street Records, CSR-CD 8701, 1987)

Pacific Rim (Cambridge Street Records, CSR-CD 9101, 1991)

Song of Songs (Cambridge Street Records, CSR-CD 9401, 1994)

Inside (Cambridge Street Records, CSR-CD 9601, 1996)

Islands (Cambridge Street Records, CSR-CD 0101, 2001)

Twin Souls (Cambridge Street Records, CSR-CD 0102, 2001)

SFU-40 (Cambridge Street Records, CSR-CD 0501, 2005)

Spirit Journies (Cambridge Street Records, CSR-CD 0701, 2007)

The Elements and Beyond (Cambridge Street Records, CSR-CD 1401, 2014)

Personal Website: www.sfu.ca/~truax

Compositional Archive: https://sonus.ca/resultats/Barry%20Truax

Primary Materials Archive: https://www.archive.bccreativehub.com
