= Preachers Daughter =

Preachers Daughter may refer to:

- daughter of a preacher, a preacher's kid
- Preacher's Daughter, a 2022 album by Ethel Cain
- Preachers' Daughters, a 2010s reality TV show
- Holly Holm (ring name "The Preacher's Daughter"; born 1981), U.S. boxer and mixed martial artist

== See also ==
- The girl of the preacher man, 1970 Italian film
- Preacher (disambiguation)
- Daughter (disambiguation)
- Preacher's kid (disambiguation)
- Preacher's Son (disambiguation)
- Son of a Preacher Man (disambiguation)
