= List of sound art organizations and festivals =

This is a list of sound art organizations and festivals.

- Het Apollohuis was a space for experimental music and visual arts, focused in particular on sound art, new music, performance art and the new media, founded in Eindhoven, Netherlands, by Remko Scha and Paul Panhuysen in a former 19th century cigar factory in 1980.
- Groupe de recherches musicales, a French centre of research into sound and electroacoustic music
- Harvestworks, a New York organisation facilitating art works using new technologies with an emphasis on sound
- IRCAM, a French institute dedicated to the research of music and sound
- Le Son 7, a gallery dedicated to audio-only sound art. Based in France
- Lydgalleriet, a gallery dedicated to sound art in Bergen, Norway
- Rewire Festival an annual festival with a focus on contemporary electronic music, neo-classical, new jazz, experimental pop, sound art and multidisciplinary collaborations
- Sound and Music, the UK's national charitable agency for new music, formed from four bodies including the Sonic Arts Network
- STEIM, Amsterdam, the Netherlands
- Tellus Audio Cassette Magazine
- Ubuweb, website with a large info archive on the subject.
- XORKO Collaborative Arts Movement
