= Preacher (disambiguation) =

A preacher is someone who preaches sermons.

Preacher or Preachers may also refer to:

== Arts and entertainment ==
- Preacher (comics), a 1990s American comic book series published by Vertigo
  - Preacher (TV series), a 2010s American supernatural adventure TV show adapted from the comic book
- The Preacher, a book of the Bible, referring to Ecclesiastes, as well as its author
- The Preacher (Dune), a fictional character in the Dune universe
- The Preacher (novel), a sequel to the Swedish novel The Ice Princess
- The Preacher (film), a 2004 Dutch thriller
- "The Preacher" (Gunsmoke), a 1956 television episode
- Preachers (musical group), a Ghanaian urban gospel group
- "The Preacher" (Horace Silver song), a jazz standard originally recorded in 1955
- "The Preacher", a song on the 1988 album In the Spirit of Things by the progressive rock band Kansas
- "The Preacher", a song on the 2009 album Us by the rapper Brother Ali
- "Preacher", a song on the 2013 album Native by the pop rock band OneRepublic

== People ==
- G. Lloyd Preacher (1882–1972), American architect

=== Nickname or stagename ===
- Preacher Davis, American baseball player
- Jimmy "Preacher" Ellis (1934–2022), American jazz musician
- Preacher Henry (1911–1992), American baseball player
- Preacher Lawson (born 1991), American comedian
- Preacher Moss (born 1967), American comedian
- Preacher Pilot (1941–1991), American football player
- Preacher Roe, nickname of Major League Baseball pitcher Elwin Roe (1916–2008)
- Preacher (1929–1931), nickname of Loyd Roberts (1907–1989), college football and basketball player

=== Fictional characters ===
- The Preacher (Dune), a fictional character from Frank Herbert's Dune milieu
- "Preacher" Middleton, a fictional character from the TV show Virgin River
- "Preacher" Harry Powell, a fictional character from The Night of the Hunter

== Groups, organizations ==
- Order of Preachers, the Dominican Order, a Roman Catholic order
- Southwestern Preachers football, the Preachers, the football team for Southwestern College, Winfield, Kansas, USA; former name of the Moundbuilders
- Parsons Preachers, the Preachers, a minor league baseball team of Parsons, Kansas, USA
- Preachers (musical group), Ghanaian gospel group
- The Preachers, a band founded by Tony Chapman

== Other uses ==
- Preachers' House, Gdańsk, Poland; a townhouse
- Preacher Mountain, King County, Washington State, USA; a mountain

== See also ==
- The Preatures, Australian band
- Preacher Jack (born 1942), U.S. musician
- itinerant preacher
- lay preacher
- Preacher-man (disambiguation)
- Preacher's kid (disambiguation)
- Preacher's Son (disambiguation)
- Preachers Daughter (disambiguation)
