= Preacher's Son =

(The) Preacher(s)(')(s) Son(s) may refer to:

- son of a preacher, a preacher's kid
- The Preacher's Son, 2003 album y Wyclef Jean
- Preacher's Sons, 2008 documentary film
- Preachers Son, Irish band

== See also ==
- "Preacher Boy", a Billie Holiday jazz song
- Preacher's Boy, 1999 children's novel
- Son of a Preacher Man (disambiguation)
- Preacher's kid (disambiguation)
- Preachers Daughter (disambiguation)
