= Alwynne Pritchard =

British composer

Alwynne Pritchard (born 1968, Glasgow) is an interdisciplinary artist based in Bergen, Norway. She is of Scottish, Welsh, English, Polish and Irish heritage. Alwynne is the daughter of the composer Gwyn Pritchard. She studied composition at the Royal Academy of Music in London and has a Master's degree in Musicology and a PhD in Composition from the University of Bristol. Her work combines her skills as a composer, singer, actor, physical performer and violinist with her interest in text, costume and video.

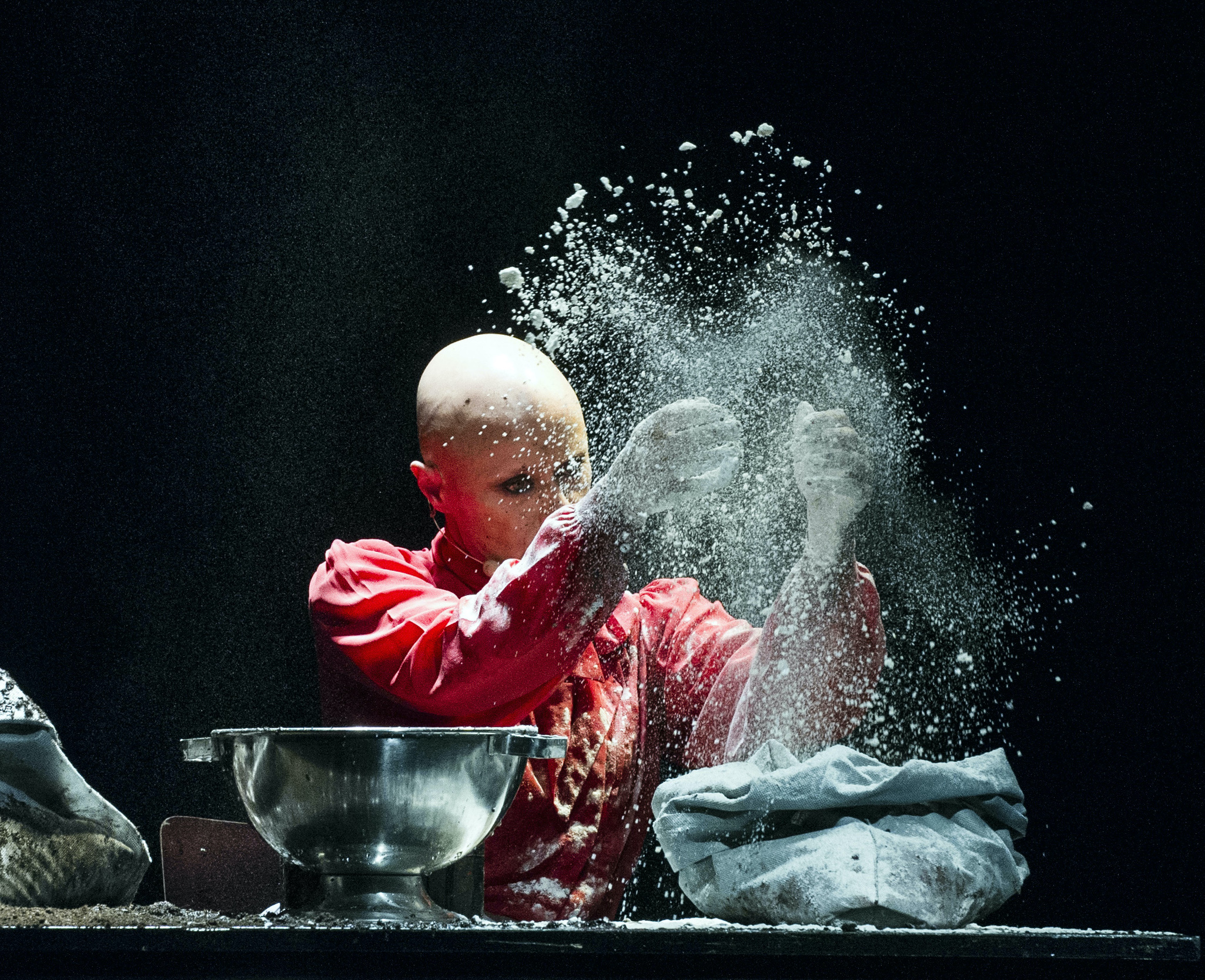
Alwynne Pritchard performing DOG/GOD at the 2015 Festspillene i Bergen (Bergen International Festival). Photograph by Thor Brødreskift.

Alwynne's performances, compositions and installations have been presented around the world and in 2005 her electro-acoustic composition Decoy, created at the Experimentalstudio des SWR in Freiburg for the Donaueschingen Musiktage, received the special prize given by the Foundation Ton Bruynèl, STEIM and the Foundation GAUDEAMUS. In 2019, she was nominated by BIT Teatergarasjen for the Bergens Tidende Audience Award (Publikumspris) and in 2024, her work Counting Backwards was nominated for Work of the Year (Årets Verk) by the Norwegian Society of Composers.

In 2016, Alwynne was awarded the commission to create a fanfare or ‘marker’ to celebrate the opening of the University of Bergen’s newly established Department of Art, Music and Design, for which she created the book of text scores, up without an insistent casting away. In 2015, she co-founded the music-theatre company Neither Nor.

Alwynne's professional life has also included stints as a presenter for BBC Radio 3, a composition teacher at Trinity Laban in London and as Artistic Director of both the Borealis festival and BIT20 Ensemble. Her music is published by Verlag Neue Musik, Berlin.

== Selected concert composition premieres ==
- Institutions of the Flesh, Alpaca Ensemble, Avgarde concert series, Bergen, 2021 and nyMusikk, Only Connect Trondheim, 2023
- Ark, Currentes Ensemble and the Museum of Natural History, Bergen, 2021
- Heart of Glass, Zubin Kanga, London Contemporary Music Festival, 2019
- Nostalgia, Sonar Quartett, Villa Elisabeth, Berlin, 2019
- Public People, Splitter Orchester and ensemble mosaik, Radialsystem V, Berlin, 2018
- From a Distant Far Inside, WITHIN II, Bergen Assembly, Bergen, 2016
- Rockaby, BBC Scottish Symphony Orchestra with composer as vocalist, Tectonics festival, Glasgow, 2016
- Glorvina, fixed media, BBC Proms, London, 2012
- Graffiti, Christian Dierstein and EXPERIMENTALISTUDIO des SWR, Heinrich-Strobel-Saal, SWR studio, Freiburg, 2007 •
- Map of the Moon, Nicolas Hodges and the BBC Scottish Symphony Orchestra, Glasgow, 2007
- Decoy, Ensemble Recherche and EXPERIMENTALSTUDIO des SWR, Donaueschinger Musiktage (SWR), 2004
- Der Glücklose Engel, Apartment House, University of Bristol, 1999
- Der Zwerg, Nicolas Hodges, University of Oxford Schubert Bicentenary Symposium, Denis Arnold Hall, 1997
- Nocturnal, BBC, Arditti String Quartet, Institute for Contemporary Art, London, 1995

== Music-theatre/Interdisciplinary works and performances ==
- All Dressed Up And Nowhere To Go (with Susanne Zapf), Hilbertraum, Berlin, 2024
- Dream Boat, for B-Open, Beffen, Bergen, 2024
- Nature aggressive, music for live illustration performance by Baptise Deyrail and Domizia Tosatto, Les Rencentres de Barizière, 2024
- Plañideras: Historia de convertir una tragedia en producto, music (with Thorolf Thuestad—Neither Nor) for dance performance, tour of Spanish venues, 2024
- Unwriting: Part 1 (Departure), nyMusikk, Oslo, 2023
- Living Room (film version), ensemble consord, 2023
- Counting Backwards, BIT20 Ensemble, Borealis festival, Bergen, 2023
- MONGREL - Dogs, Gods, Bitches and Demons, commissioned and other solo pieces presented in combination with own works, Dimitira festival, Thessaloniki, 2022
- Beethoven Ascending 360, installation, Klangzeit Münster, 2022
- EDEN, collaborative dance project with Julia Koch, Ulm Moves!, Roxy Ulm and Tanznetz, E-Werk, Freiburg, 2022
- Gåologi, collaborative project with Eva Pfitzenmaier, BIT Teatergarasjen, Bergen, 2022
- Intonation, final performance for the University of Bergen Wheels within Wheels Artistic Research programme, Bergen International Festival (FiB), 2018
- Stamp Club Report 1980, Kammerkoret GNEIS and friends, Østre and Visningsrom USF, Bergen, 2018
- Hospice Lazy, Alpaca trio and Alwynne Pritchard, Dokkhuset, Trondheim, 2014; Avant Garden Trondheim and E-Werk Freiburg, 2017; and USF Verftet, Bergen, 2018
- We, three (after Samuel Beckett's Come and Go), trio Alpaca, Avant Garden, Trondheim and E-Werk, Freiburg, 2017
- Regnsvart on texts by Erland Nødtvedt, GNEIS chamber choir, Borealis festival, Bergen, 2017
- Vitality Forms 5 and 6, Alwynne Pritchard, Bastard Assignments: New Teeth 1, London, 2016
- Vitality Forms 3 and 4, Alwynne Pritchard, Forum Kunst und Kultur, Essen, 2015
- Vitality Forms 2, Ensemble CRUSH, Schloss Benrath, Düsseldorf, 2015
- Vitality Forms 1, Alwynne Pritchard, Kunstpalast Düsseldorf, 2015
- The Art of Violin Playing (A Neither Nor production), work-in-progress performance, o espaço do tempo, Montemor-o-Novo and Cornerteateret, Bergen, 2015
- Homing (A Neither Nor production), Adam de la Cour, Claudia Klasicka, Anders Ohnstad, Thorolf Thuestad and Veronica Thorseth, Borealis festival, Bergen, 2015
- Oh no love, you're not alone, Alpaca ensemble + Andreas Elvenes, video, Dokkhuset, Trondheim and Soddjazz festival, 2013
- Erika married the Eiffel Tower, ensemble recherche + video, Ultima festival, Oslo and Muzikprotokoll, Graz, 2013
- Oslo Emmaus, Ensemble Fanfaronner and video, Borealis festival, Odda, 2011
- Objects of Desire, ensemble recherche, Amsterdam, 2010
- Source of energy, routes of power, ensemble Scratch the Surface, Kleine Thermin, Kempten, 2010
- Flutterby, POW ensemble, Muziekgebouw, Amsterdam, 2009
- Don't touch me, you don't know where I’ve been, Bjørnar Habbestad, Alwynne Pritchard, asamisimasa ensemble and electronics (Thorolf Thuestad at BEK, Bergen), Borealis festival, Bergen, 2008
- Frame, Athelas ensemble, electronics (developed at IEM, Graz) and film, European Integra program (Culture 2000), PLEX theatre, Copenhagen, 2007

== Theatre ==
- Issue Commune (composer and performer), Scènes Théâtre Cinéma, Barizière des Possibles, 2024
- Underground (co-composer with Thorolf Thuestad and actor), Scènes Théâtre Cinéma/Neither Nor production, TNG, Lyon and Cornertateret, Bergen, 2019
- Hamlet Machine (co-composer with Thorolf Thuestad and actor), Scènes Théâtre Cinéma/Neither Nor, Théâtre du Point du Jour, Lyon, 2016
- Bull's eye (actor), Scènes Théâtre Cinéma, Marseille, 2013

== Installations and exhibitions ==
- Parlour, collaborative installation with NEOQUARTET (Gdańsk), for Lydgalleriet, Bergen, 2021
- up without an insistent casting away, site-specific performance for the opening ceremony, Department of Fine Art, and the Department of Design for the faculty of Fine Art, Music and Design, University of Bergen, 2017 and 2018
- Guardian Angels, exhibition of portrait photographs by Alwynne Pritchard, The Cello Factory, London, 2013
- Tear me, eat me, burn me, laser-cut paper, mirror, backlighting, 4 x framed graphic-score-inspired pieces, Visningssrommet USF, Borealis festival, Notations exhibition, 2013
- Don't touch me, you don't know where I've been, installation version, KhiB Sensuous Knowledge Conference, Os (Norway), 2009
- A Cognitive Theory of Metaphor, sound installation created by Thorolf Thuestad and Alwynne Pritchard for ZUPER KLASSIK FREAKY AVANT GARDE, Lydgalleriet, Bergen, 2009
- Don't touch me, you don't know where I've been, in-stallation version, B-Open, BEK (Bergen Centre for Electronic Arts), Bergen, 2008
- Sheet Music, performance by Parkinson Saunders on paper instruments made by Laura Murray and Alwynne Pritchard, SAN Expo Brighton and Lost and Found conference/concert, Oxford, 2008
- Sheet Music, performance by FAT BATTERY on paper instruments made by Laura Murray and Alwynne Pritchard, AVGARDE, Bergen, 2006
- Sheet Music, performance by Jørgen Larsson, Bjørnar Habbestad, Maia Urstad, Thorolf Thuestad and Alwynne Pritchard on paper instruments made by Laura Murray and Alwynne Pritchard, Lydgalleriet, Bergen, 2006
- Sheet Music, exhibition of photographs of paper instruments made by Laura Murray and Alwynne Pritchard, USF Verftet, Bergen, 2006

== Books ==
- up without an insistent casting away, text pieces commissioned to celebrate the opening of the Department of Fine Art, and the Department of Design for the faculty of Fine Art, Music and Design, University of Bergen, 2017

== CDs ==
- Les Soliloques décortiqués (as solo vocalist), portrait of Vinko Globokar with BIT20 Ensemble, Kairos, 2020
- Rockaby, Kairos, 2019
- Alpaca Bowie, Oh No Love, You're Not Alone, Øra Fonogram, 2015
- To the Ground, Victoria Johnson (electric violin) and Thorolf Thuestad (electronics), Suspended Beginnings, Farbor Melker Records, 2012
- Subterfuge In Vitro, keda records, 2005
- The Barnyard Song, Elena Riu's Little Book of Salsa, Boosey and Hawkes, 2004
- Geometry of Pain I, Wittener Tage für neue Kammer musik, documentation disc, 2002
- Invisible Cities (portrait disc), Metier, 2002
- Invisible Cities, Darmstadt disc, 2000

== Films ==
- My love is like, online video project, 2022
- Neighbourhood (for Gåologi), Chiak Art Center, Wonju (South Korea), 2021
- Time Capsule (Zwischen Uns) with ensemble consord, presented online, 2021
- I am Dog, animation film with illustrations by Domizia Tosatto, LitFest Bergen, 2021
