= Preacher's kid (disambiguation) =

Preacher's kid refers to the child of a church leader which may be used descriptively or as a stereotype.

Preacher's kid also refers to:

- Preacher's Kid (EP), an extended play by Semler
- Preacher's Kid (film), a 2010 American film by Stan Foster

== See also ==
- Son of a Preacher Man (disambiguation)
- Preacher-man (disambiguation)
- Preacher's Son (disambiguation)
- Preachers Daughter (disambiguation)
- Preacher (disambiguation)
- Kid (disambiguation)
