= Pter =

Pter may refer to:

- Pter (locus), the end of a chromosome
- pter-, a prefix meaning "wing" used in taxonomy

== See also ==
- Pteri, a village in Achaea, Greece
- Pteria (disambiguation)
- Ter (disambiguation)
