= Son of a Preacher Man (disambiguation) =

"Son of a Preacher Man" is a 1968 song by Dusty Springfield.

Son of a Preacher Man or Son of a Preacherman, may also refer to:

- Son of a Preacher Man (John Rich album), 2009
- Son of a Preacher Man (Nancy Wilson album), 1969
- Son of a Preacher Man (video), a 1998 concert video by Collide
- "The Son of a Preacherman", 1992 season 4 number 13 episode 83 of Empty Nest
- son of a preacher, a preacher's kid

== See also ==
- Gun of a Preacher Man, 2005 live album by Amen
- The girl of the preacher man, 1970 Italian film
- Preacher's kid (disambiguation)
- Preacher's Son (disambiguation)
- Preachers Daughter (disambiguation)
- Preacher-man (disambiguation)
