= Koloff =

Koloff is a surname. Notable people with the surname include:

- Ivan Koloff (1942–2017), Canadian wrestler
- Kolby Koloff (born 1996), American Christian musician
- Nikita Koloff (born 1959), American wrestler

== See also ==
- Kolff
