= Ter =

Ter or TER may refer to:

== Places ==
- River Ter, in Essex, England
- Ter (river), in Catalonia
- Ter (department), a region in France
- Torre (river), (Slovene: Ter), a river in Italy
- Ter, Ljubno, a settlement in the Municipality of Ljubno ob Savinji, Slovenia
- Ter, Maharashtra, India, a former city and archaeological site
- Terang railway station, Australia
- Lajes Field (IATA airport code TER), a multi-use airfield in Azores, Portugal

== Other uses ==
- Ter Sami language, spoken on the Kola Peninsula
- Terêna, a language spoken in Brazil
- Tertiary Entrance Rank, an Australian score
- Terzan Catalogue, an astronomical catalogue of globular clusters
- Total expense ratio of investment fund
- Transport express régional, of the French rail network
- Train Express Regional Dakar-AIBD, of Senegal
- Teradyne (NYSE stock symbol)
- Ter (title), Armenian hereditary honorific
- Trump Entertainment Resorts, a former gambling and hospitality company
- Chantavit Dhanasevi, nicknamed Ter, Thai actor and screenwriter

== See also ==
- Pter (disambiguation)
