= Obed Psych =

- Portrait of Obed Psych

Background information
- Born: Obed Awelinga-Nzuh; Bawku, Upper East Region, Ghana
- Genres: Hip Hop; Gospel; Afropop
- Occupations: Singer; songwriter; Rapper
- Years active: 2009 – present
- Member of: Preachers

Obed Mpanga Awelinga-Nzuh, popularly known as Obed Psych, is a Ghanaian-Canadian rapper, singer and songwriter. He began his music career in 2009 as a member of the Ghanaian Christian hip-hop group Preachers, before starting a solo career.

== Early life ==
Obed Psych was raised in Bawku, in Ghana's Upper East Region. His later solo work has drawn extensively on his Kusaug background and the Kusaal language.

== Career ==
=== 2009-2019: Preachers ===
Obed Psych began his professional music career in 2009 as one of the founding members of Preachers, a Ghanaian Christian hip-hop group. Early members included Obed Psych, Edmund Baidoo, Emmanuel Awuni (Emani Beats), Dennis Enim and Michelle Majid-Michel. The group subsequently continued with a smaller lineup. Preachers released the mixtape Very Special in 2010 and the album Mark 16:15 in 2012. The group later received awards and nominations including Discovery of the Year at the 2012 Ghana Gospel Music Awards and the Africa Gospel Music Awards.

=== 2020-2023: Solo career and Winpang ===
Obed Psych's early solo recordings included songs such as "You Are Not Alone", "Yuum Kanga", "Odin", "Introspection", "More of You" and "Number One". On 27 July 2021, Psych released his debut EP, Winpang. The six-track project was recorded primarily in Kusaal. a Ghanaian indigenous language.

=== 2024-present ===
Obed Psych continued releasing music and performing in Canada following his relocation in 2024. At the 2025 Upper East Music Awards, Obed Psych won Male Vocalist of the Year and Rap Performance of the Year. In January 2025 Obed Psych collaborated with musician Lamisi on a song titled "Together Forever". In September 2026, he released "Pele", a tribute to Ghanaian footballer Abedi Ayew Pele.

As of September 2026 Psych is based in Vancouver.

== Awards and nominations ==
Year	Organization	Award	Nominated work	Result
2020	Ghana Urban Gospel Music Awards	Rap Artist Of The Year	Obed Psych	Nominated
2022	Upper East Music Awards	Rapper Of The Year	Obed Psych	Won
2022	Upper East Music Awards	Record Of The Year	Obed Psych	Won
2022	Gospel Family Jam Music Awards	Artist Of The Year	Obed Psych	Won
2022	Gospel Family Jam Music Awards	Hip-Hop / R&B Song of the Year	Odin	Won
2025	Upper East Music Awards	Male Vocalist Of The Year	Obed Psych	Won
2025	Upper East Music Awards	Rap Performance Of The Year	Obed Psych	Won

== Discography ==
=== EPs and Albums ===
- Winpang (2021)

=== Singles ===
- "You Are Not Alone"
- "Yuum Kanga"
- "Odin"
- "Introspection"
- "More of You"
- "Number One"
- "Rely on You"featuring Ayanna Gregory
- "Bad Energy"
- "Beautiful Morning"
- "No Competition"
- "Zanne (Timoriba)"
- "Ten"
- "Kusaal"
- "In the Air"
- "Sumbin"
- "The Greatest"
- "Pele"
- "Together Forever"Feat. Lamisi
