= Daughter (disambiguation) =

A daughter is a female offspring.

Daughter may also refer to:

== Arts, entertainment, and media ==
=== Film and television ===
- Daughter (2014 film), a South Korean film
- Daughter (2016 film)
- Daughter (2019 film), aka Dcera, a 2019 Czech animated short film
- Daughter (2022 film), an American horror film
- Daughter 2, a 1996 Thai film
- Daughters, a 1997 American film, starring Claudia Silva
- Daughters (1997 film), aka Our Mother's Murder, a 1997 American made-for-TV film
- Daughters (2024 film), a 2024 documentary and winner at the Sundance Film Festival
- Dukhtar, aka Daughter, a 2014 Pakistani film
- The Daughter (2012 film), a 2012 Greek film
- The Daughter (2015 film), a 2015 Australian film
- The Daughter (2021 film), a 2021 Spanish film
- "Daughters" (NCIS), a 2019 television episode
- "Daughters" (The Vice), a 1999 television episode

=== Literature ===
- The Daughter (play), an 1836 play by James Sheridan Knowles
- The Daughter (novel), a Greek novel
- Daughter (novel), the 2019 novel by Tamara Duda

=== Music ===
==== Groups ====
- Daughter (band), London-based band
- Daughters (band), an American rock band

==== Albums and EPs ====
- Daughter, a 2022 album by Janice Vidal
- Daughters (album), the self-titled 2010 studio album by band Daughters
- Daughters (EP), the self-titled 2002 EP by band Daughters

==== Songs ====
- "Daughter" (song), from Pearl Jam's album Vs., 1993
- "Daughter", by Beyoncé from Cowboy Carter, 2024
- "Daughter", by Daughters from You Won't Get What You Want, 2018
- "Daughter", by The Devil Wears Prada from Transit Blues, 2016
- "Daughter", by Loudon Wainwright III from Strange Weirdos, 2007
- "Daughter", by Sleeping at Last from Atlas: Life, 2015
- "Daughter", by Status Quo from Ma Kelly's Greasy Spoon, 1970
- "Daughter", by The Blenders August 1963
- "Daughters" (John Mayer song), from the album Heavier Things, 2003
- "Daughters" (Nas song), from the album Life Is Good, 2012
- "Daughters", by The Story So Far from Under Soil And Dirt, 2011
- "The Daughters", by Little Big Town from Nightfall, 2019

== Science ==
- Daughter cell, the biological cells resulting from cell division
- Daughter isotope, in physics, a nuclide formed by radioactive decay of another

== Other uses ==
- Daughter language, in linguistics, any later language derived from an earlier language, or a subordinate node in a phrase structure tree
- Daughterboard, in computing, a subordinate extension of a motherboard
