= Le Son 7 =

Sound art gallery

Coordinates: 43.3253°N 3.0439°E

- Established: 2021
- Location: 37, Cours Belfort Capestang, France
- Directors: Carolina Podestá & Andrew Footner
- Website: www.leson7.com

Le Son 7 is a sound art gallery dedicated exclusively to audio. The gallery works with many artists to present different aspects of sound art including field recording, sound collage, poetics, artificial intelligence and found sound.

The works are presented on headphones and on loudspeakers and are sold in high quality WAV format as unique pieces.

== Artists ==
Le Son 7 represents works by the following artists:

- Theo Altenberg
- Laurie Anderson
- Little Annie
- François J Bonnet
- Fari Bradley
- Anla Courtis
- Caroline Devine
- Marivaldo Dos Santos
- Beatriz Ferreyra
- Lesley Flanigan
- Burnt Friedman
- Paula Garcia
- Jorge Haro
- Marina Abramovic
- Matthew Herbert
- Miranda July
- Kathy Hinde
- François K
- Nyokabi Kariũki
- KMRU
- Bernie Krause
- Ann Magnuson
- Elsa M'Bala
- Abdullah Miniawy
- Emeka Ogboh
- Robin Rimbaud
- Steloolive
- Marc Urselli
- Nicolás Varchausky
- Paul Wallfisch
- Stephen Vitiello

== Exhibitions ==
Besides its permanent space in Capestang in the south of France, the gallery holds exhibitions in different cities:

- Paris 2021 32 rue Pastourelle, Le Marais. December 2-12
- Buenos Aires 2022 Aberg Cobo, Av. Las Heras 1722, Recoletta. March 18-April 2
- London 2022 7 Club Row, London, October 13-23
- Madrid 2023 calle Doctor Fourquet, 10, Lavapies, May 3-13
- New York 2024 570 Broome Street, NYC, January 9-14
- Paris 2024 8 Rue Chapon, Paris, September 17-22
- Berlin 2025 16 Glogauer Str, Berlin, June 26 - 6 July

== Listening Sessions ==
The gallery also presents listening sessions in different formats and different spaces, including:

- Artlab Buenos Aires, Argentina 12 March 2023
- New Ear Festival New York City, USA 7 January 2024
- Rada Tilly Centro Cultural Patagonia, Argentina 2 March 2024
- MRAC Serignan Herault, France 18 May 2024
