= Trevor Lee (disambiguation) =

Trevor Lee (born 1993) is an American wrestler.

Trevor Lee may also refer to:

- Trevor Lee (footballer) (born 1954), English footballer
- Trevor Lee (politician), member of the Utah House of Representatives
- Trevor Lee (musician), American musician
