= Trevor Lee (musician) =

American musician (born 1988)

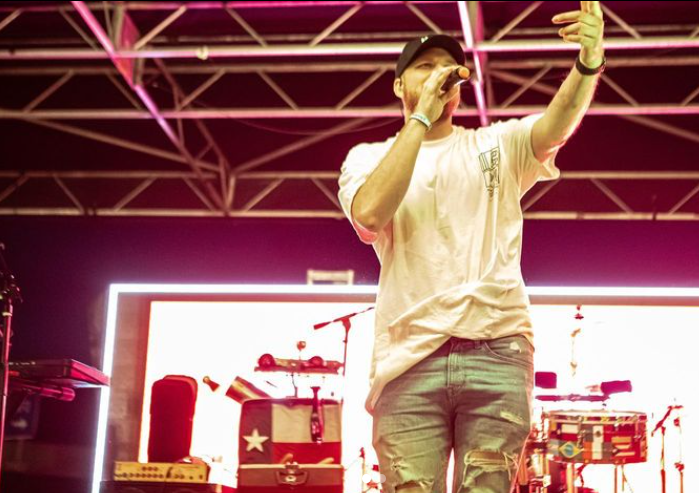

Background information
- Also known as: Trevor Lee
- Born: Trevor Lee Chapman; April 19, 1988, Age 34; Huntsville, Alabama
- Genres: Hip-Hop and R&B
- Occupation: Musician
- Website: https://www.trevorleemusic.com/

Trevor Lee Chapman(born April 19, 1988), professionally known as Trevor Lee, is an American musician. He is best known for his song "Barbershop Freestyle", which was inspired by a freestyle rap he performed at a barbershop in Florida that went viral on YouTube in 2018. The video resurfaced on TikTok in 2019 and has received more than 2.2 million views. The song itself is Lee's most streamed song to date.

== Career ==
Lee recorded his first album at the age of 14 in a local studio with a music group he started with a friend. After graduating from high school, he started working in the music industry as a creative director for acts that were local to his area. He was performing and working in the studio in 2014 and released his single "Fittna Hate" in April 2017. Lee went on to record and release his debut album Struggle Ain't New in May 2017 as a result of a deal with Rapture Life Records. The album was produced by Houston, Texas producers Brandon De La Garza (aka MixbyBrandon), Cameron Giddings, and Bruce Bang and contained eight tracks, including the title track, which featured Pesmaker. Lee released three more singles in 2017 with "Get Luv", "Over Here", and "Prollems". In the following year, he released his singles "Ole", "O.M.M.Y.Y", and "Sosa Nova". He also released several singles with featured artists including "Twenny Pho", featuring Fvmeless and Druzu, and "Err Dae", featuring AJ McQueen. The music videos for those singles and all subsequent singles have been produced, directed, and edited by Lee. The videos that were released on YouTube from this era of his career have more than 20,000 views total.

2018 was the first year that Lee went viral when he was recorded performing an authentic freestyle rap at Modern Man Barbershop in Florida. Lee had been encouraged by Atlanta music producer BubbaGotBeatz to record himself freestyling to showcase his skills. After sending the video to BubbaGotBeatz and getting uploaded to Instagram and YouTube, it started going viral. The video has more than 1.4 million views on YouTube and in 2019 it started getting traction on TikTok, where it has more than 2.2 million views. Following the success of the video, Lee made the freestyle into a single that was released in 2019 and it is his most streamed song to date.

Lee released three more singles in 2019 with "Ignant", "Want U Back", and "Perspectiv". He collaborated with other musical artists including Cultyre, Kolby Koloff, and Christina Tripp. In 2020, he released new singles including "Pause" and "Fadin" (both of which featured Victoria Jones), as well as "Worth It", "Roun", and "Contagious Views". The accompanying music videos that were released on YouTube for his singles in 2020 have more than 500,000 views total, bringing the total views for all of his videos to more than 1 million. Throughout his career, Lee performed at venues and festivals across the United States, including SXSW, the Texas Taco Tequila Music Festival, and Boomin by the Bay.

In 2022, Lee performed at the main showcase for The World Games. The event was featured on CBS and Lee performed with DJ Primetime256 at the Regions World Game Plaza. In March of the same year, he headlined at Fantom Aftermath at Sidetracks Music Hall in his hometown of Huntsville, Alabama. Lee's single "Dream Life" was released in October 2022 and was the number 1 most popular song on SubmitHub upon its release.

== Discography ==
=== Singles ===
- "Take Me Home" featuring W/U (June 24, 2014)
- "Hurricane", featuring DJ Sean Curtis and Eff3cts (January 21, 2015)
- "Save the Day" (February 21, 2017)
- "Fittna Hate" (April 4, 2017)
- "Get Luv"(June 27, 2017)
- "Over Here" (September 4, 2017)
- "Prollems"(October 13, 2017)
- "Olé"(January 1, 2018)
- "Twenny Pho" featuring Druzu and Fvmeless (January 31, 2018)
- "O.M.M.Y.Y"(February 14, 2018)
- "Sosa Nova" (March 24, 2018)
- "Err Dae" featuring AJ McQueen (October 12, 2018)
- "Barbershop"(Freestyle) (March 27, 2019)
- "Ignant" (April 10, 2019)
- "Want U Back" featuring Kolby Koloff and Cultyre (July 19, 2019)
- "Perspectiv" featuring Christina Tripp (August 4, 2019)
- "Pause" featuring Victoria Jones (January 19, 2020)
- "Worth It" (March 22, 2020)
- "Roun"(August 23, 2020)
- "Contagious Views" (August 28, 2020)
- "Fadin"(October 23, 2020)
- "DreamLife" (October 10, 2022)

=== Album ===
Struggle Ain't New

- Released: 2017
- Writer: Trevor Lee
- Producer: Brandon De La Garza a.k.a. MixbyBrandon, Cameron Giddings, & Bruce Bang
- Tracks: 8

== Reviews ==
Lee's 2021 holiday single, "Everyday is Christmas" was called "uplifting" and Lee's 2022 single "Dream Life" was described as "an authentic take on relationship woes".
