= Gwyn Pritchard =

British composer and ensemble director

Gwyn Pritchard (born 29 January 1948 in Richmond, Yorkshire, England) is a British composer, ensemble and festival director, and teacher.

== Life ==
Pritchard was born in Yorkshire and brought up on a farm near Marlborough, Wiltshire. His parents were not musicians, but his family inherited a piano when he was 11 and he began to teach himself to play and to compose. At 13 he also took up the cello, developing quickly, and in 1966 he was accepted to the Royal Scottish Academy in Glasgow to study the instrument with Joan Dickson, and composition with Dr Frank Spedding. After graduating he worked briefly as Director of Music at Salisbury Cathedral School, then as a freelance cellist in London. In 1971 he was employed by the BBC, firstly as an orchestral cellist, and later as the subject of a documentary film. In the late 1970s performances of his Objects in Space and Mercurius at London’s South Bank attracted national and international attention. Since then he has worked as a freelance composer, ensemble and festival director, and a teacher. Since 2008 he has taught composition and orchestration at the Trinity Laban Conservatoire of Music and Dance, London, where he was appointed a Professor in January 2017.

The composer Alwynne Pritchard is his daughter.

== Career ==
In 1979 Pritchard’s music was performed at the Warsaw Autumn Festival for the first time, and his career has since been divided between his home country, mainland Europe and many other countries around the world: more than half of his commissions and first performances have taken place in countries outside the UK. As well as Poland these include Switzerland, where he has an ongoing association with several ensembles based in Basel; Italy, where he founded the Reggello International Festival of Contemporary and Classical Music in 2003; and Germany, where he has been closely associated with a number of festivals, including the Weimar Spring Days for Contemporary Music, at which he has been represented as a composer, conductor and competition judge since 2008. His principal publisher, Verlag Neue Musik, is based in Berlin.

In 1979 he was a featured composer, alongside Witold Lutosławski, at the International New Music Week, Southampton, and since then his music has been represented at many major international festivals, including the Zepernicker Randspiele (Berlin), Daegu International Contemporary Music Festival (S Korea), Huddersfield Contemporary Music Festival, ISCM World Music Days, Tanglewood (USA), Warsaw Autumn and Wien Modern. As well as being performed in many European countries, as well as Australia, Canada, China, Hong Kong, New Zealand, South Korea and the USA, Pritchard’s music has been frequently broadcast, often under his own direction, on many radio and television networks. These include the BBC, who commissioned The Firmament of Time in 2008 for performance by the BBC Symphony Orchestra. Portrait concerts have been given by in Salzburg (2011) by the Österreichisches Ensemble für Neue Musik, in Chur (2016) by Ensemble ö! and in Gdańsk (2019) at the NeoArte Festival.

Pritchard is also active as a new music promoter. In 1982 he founded the Uroboros Ensemble, a group that has given world premieres of works by David Bedford, Joe Cutler, Michael Finnissy, Gerhard Stäbler, James Weeks and John Woolrich, among others, as well as of several pieces by Pritchard himself. Performers who have played with Uroboros include Joby Burgess, Roger Heaton, Darragh Morgan, Christopher Redgate and Paul Silverthorne. As well as the Reggello festival, Pritchard co-founded the London Ear Festival of Contemporary Music in 2013 with the Italian composer Andrea Cavallari. He was awarded a Composers' Fund Award by the PRS Foundation in 2017 to support the composition of his orchestral work Forest.

== Selected works ==
=== Orchestral ===
- Concerto for Viola and Orchestra (1967, rev. 1984)
- Spring Music (1972)
- Mercurius (1979)
- La Settima Bolgia (1989)
- The Firmament of Time (2008)
- Forest (2017)

=== Ensemble and chamber ===
- Ensemble Music for Six, flute, clarinet, piano, violin, viola, cello (1976)
- Nephalaxius, string quartet, 2 percussionists (1977)
- Objects in Space, clarinet, harp, percussion (1978)
- Earthcrust, 8 percussionists, piano (1980, rev. 2015)
- Moondance, solo clarinet, string trio, percussion (1982)
- Lollay, lollay, cor anglais, bass clarinet, piano, percussion, viola, cello (1983)
- Madrigal, flute, oboe/cor anglais, clarinet, percussion, harp (1987–8)
- Janus, flute and clarinet
- Wayang, flute, clarinet, piano, percussion, cello (1993)
- Demise, 3 percussionists, piano (1994)
- Features and Formations, flute, clarinet, violin, cello (2003)
- The Fruit of Chance and Necessity, solo cello, chamber orchestra (2004)
- Nebuale and Episodes, alto sax, violin, cello, percussion (2005)
- Song for Icarus, flute, violin (2006)
- Nightfall, flute, clarinet, violin, cello (2011)
- Kommos, solo oboe, string quartet, double bass, piano (2011)
- String Quartet no.1 (Conflux II) (2011)
- Evolution, flute, clarinet, violin, cello (2014)
- Colouring In, recorders, pan flute, percussion, viola, accordion (2015)
- Quintet, sax, trombone, cello, accordion, piano (2018)
- Realms Apart, clarinet, string quartet (2018)
- String Quartet no.2 (2019)
- Pacing, alto flute and harp (2019)

=== Solo instrumental ===
- Five Short Pieces for Piano (1975)
- Sonata for Guitar (1982)
- Dramaloque, percussion (1984)
- Raum greift aus, piano (1996)
- From Time to Time, piano (1999)
- Capriccio inquieto, oboe (2006)
- Two Movements for Solo Viola (2007), transcribed for violin (2007)
- Ricorrenza, cello (2009)
- Capriccio fluido, oboe (2010)
- Tide, piano (2014)

=== Vocal ===
- Enitharmon, mezzo soprano, piano (1973)
- To Jardenna, flute, percussion, narrator (1978)
- Forse mi stai chiamando, soprano, cello (1997)
- In the Silence of Turned Earth, solo soprano, solo violin, strings (2010)
- Three Songs of Mass and Motion, soprano, accordion, double bass (2014)
- Catfish in Autumn, soprano, baritone (2016)
- … What’s it all about?, female voice, electronics (2016)
