= Sound scenography =

Sound scenography (also known as acoustic scenography) is the process of staging spaces and environments through sound. It combines expertise from the fields of architecture, acoustics, communication, sound design and interaction design to convey artistic, historical, scientific, or commercial content or to establish atmospheres and moods.

== Definition ==
Initially developed as a sub-discipline of scenography, it is now primarily used in the context of exhibitions, museums, media installations and trade fairs, as well as shops, adventure parks, spas, reception areas, and open-plan offices.

Distinct from other applications in sound design, spatial localisation plays a central role in sound scenography. Sound in contexts such as film soundtracks has a synchronised and standardised listening experience. The sound experience should be the same for every visitor at every position (and in every cinema). Because exhibition spaces are freely traversable and show audio-visual content at various stations across the room, sound scenography aims at providing every visitor with an individual listening experience with distinct start and end points as well as a distinct progression. Thus, the dramaturgy of the sound experience is no longer determined by the timeline of the soundtrack, but by the position and movement of the visitor.

== Methods of Sound Scenography ==
Spaces can be staged with sound in various ways. Rooms have different tonal properties and acoustics depending on their architecture and interior design. Live musicians can spread across the room or play in motion, which is especially common in spatial music. The reproduction of sounds via loudspeakers, offers a wide range of possibilities for integrating sound into spaces and is therefore the most commonly used method. In that context, sound scenography is influenced from various practices in the wider field of sound design and composition, such as generative music, sonic interaction design, and sound masking. Loudspeaker systems used to distribute sound range from standard spatial audio setups to the more customised distributions common in sound installation, such as the Acousmatic Room Orchestration System. The spatial integration of sound delivered via headphones is a defining feature of interactive soundwalks. Leveraging technologies such as geolocation and head tracking, sounds are used to augment real environments in what the BBC's R&D department calls "Audio AR". In the more controlled environment of an exhibition, this approach has been used to create fully virtual sound environments.

== Functions of Sound Scenography ==
Sound scenography performs many of the established functions of sound in film soundtracks. It gives emotional connotations to spaces, exhibits or even individual interactions through the use of sound. Soundscapes are used to establish atmospheres and moods with varying degrees of realism. Sound content is also used to evoke memories and associations. Soundscapes and musical accents clarify visual content or re-contextualise it. Content can also be conveyed purely sonically without accompanying visual media. Especially in connection with large-scale video projection, sound is used to direct the viewer's attention. In all these application areas, sound scenography relates the different sonic components of an exhibition to one another in order to create a coherent overall soundscape.

== See also ==
- Spatial music
- Exhibit design
- Sound Art
- Acoustical engineering
