= Tamara Duda =

Ukrainian writer (born 1976)

- Тамара Дуда
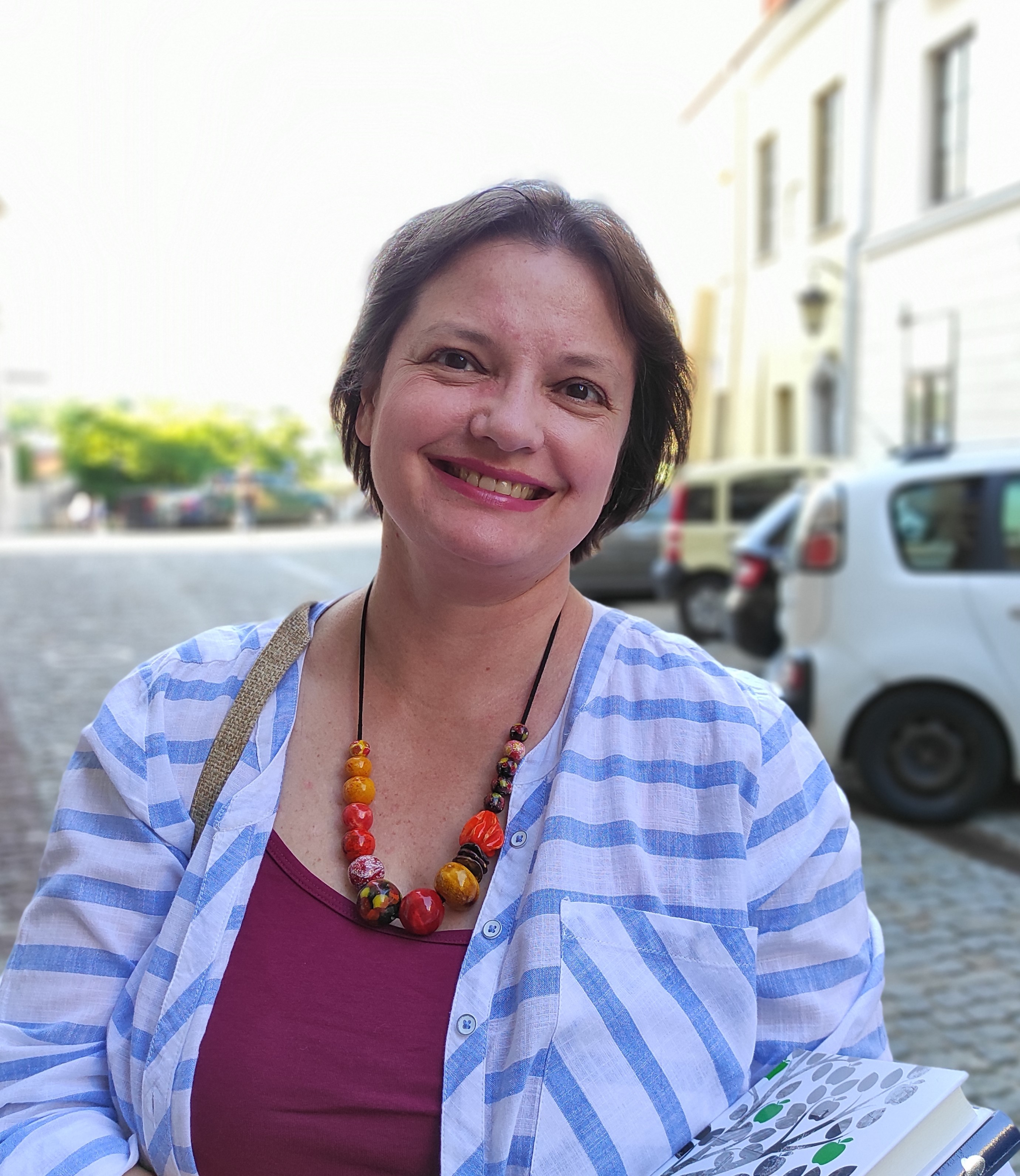
- Born: 5 January 1976 (age 50); Kyiv, Ukrainian Soviet Socialist Republic
- Citizenship: Ukraine
- Education: Taras Shevchenko University of Kyiv
- Occupation: Writer
- Spouse: Svyatoslav Boyko
- Children: 3
- Writing career
- Pen name: Tamara Horikha Zernya
- Language: Ukrainian
- Years active: 2019–present
- Genre: Fiction
- Notable work: Daughter
- Notable awards: Shevchenko National Prize, 2022

Tamara Anatoliyivna Duda (Ukrainian: Тамара Анатоліївна Дуда; born 5 January 1976), known in Ukraine by the pseudonym Tamara Horikha Zernya (Ukrainian: Тамара Горіха Зерня), is a Ukrainian writer and translator. Having first become known for her Facebook page documenting her time as a volunteer in the Donbas during the early stages of the Russo-Ukrainian War, Duda has since gone on to become a novelist, with her debut novel Daughter (2019) winning the 2022 Shevchenko National Prize for Literature, among other accolades.

== Early life and education ==
Duda was born in Kyiv in 1976. Her father was a physicist from Nedryhailiv, while her mother was a mathematics teacher from Sumy. In 1992, Duda graduated from the Ukrainian Humanities Lyceum; the following year, she started studying journalism at the Taras Shevchenko National University of Kyiv, graduating in 1998. Between 2003 and 2005, Duda studied at Kyiv International University, after which she embarked on a career as a translator, primarily of economic texts from English to Ukrainian.

== Volunteering and rise to prominence ==
Between 2014 and 2016, Duda volunteered in the Joint Forces Operation in the Donbas following the start of the Russo-Ukrainian War. After observing injured Ukrainians in hospital with eye injuries caused by shrapnel, Duda started purchasing tactical glasses from sources including the American government, and subsequently donating these to the Ukrainian army. During her time on the frontline, Duda began posting on Facebook under the pseudonym Tamara Horikha Zernya, going on to garner a large following. While volunteering, she met Svyatoslav Boyko, who she would later go on to marry; both were recognised for their voluntary efforts by the Mayor of Kyiv.

== Writing career ==
Daughter (Ukrainian: Доця, 'dotsya'), Duda's debut novel, was published in 2019 by Bilka Publishing House. Taking place in 2014 during the onset of the Russo-Ukrainian War, the novel follows Natalia, a businesswoman in Donetsk who goes on to become a volunteer in the war effort. Since its publication, Daughter has been translated into English, German, Latvian, Lithuanian, Macedonian, and Polish, and rights have been purchased to adapt it into a film. Daughter was named Book of the Year by BBC News Ukrainian, and in 2022 Duda was awarded the Shevchenko National Prize for the novel by Ukrainian President Volodymyr Zelenskyy, in addition to receiving recognition from the Lviv Book Forum and the Cherkasy Book Forum.

Duda's second novel, Pryntsyp vtruchannya (English: "the principle of intervention"), was published in 2021. The story, set in the present day, follows Stanislava, a widowed mathematics professor whose husband was killed during the Russo-Ukrainian War, who returns to her hometown in Cherkasy Oblast to help a friend investigate the whereabouts of a missing bride. The novel notably ends with Stanislava dancing on Vladimir Putin's grave.

== Personal life ==
Duda is married to musician Svyatoslav Boyko, with whom she has three children. During the COVID-19 pandemic, Duda and her family relocated from Kyiv to a village near Hlukhiv in Sumy Oblast.

== See also ==
- List of Ukrainian-language writers
- List of Ukrainian women writers
- List of Ukrainian literature translated into English
