= Cloud harp =

Open form sound installation

The cloud harp, also known as the Keplerian harp, is an open form sound installation which converts the forms of clouds into audio and musical sequences in real time. It was created by Nicolas Reeves and the NXI GESTATIO laboratory at UQAM in 1997.

The cloud harp works in a way very similar to how a CD player reads the information on a CD disc; it contains an infrared laser, which is aimed at the sky, and a telescope which senses the reflected light. A computer program then chooses synthesized tones sampled from a variety of instruments, depending on the altitude and density of the clouds above the installation. Its creator describes it as a "meteo-electronic instrument."

A version of the cloud harp was exhibited at the Lyon Cité Sonore event in 2000.
