= Marc Urselli =

Italian-Swiss music producer (born 1977)

Marc Urselli (born January 31, 1977, in Aarau, Switzerland) is an Italian-Swiss freelance New York City & London-based audio engineer, music producer, mixing engineer, live sound engineer, remixer, sound designer, composer, musician, contributor, and blogger.

He has been nominated for a Grammy Award seven times and he has won the award three times.

He is best known for his work as a recording and mixing engineer (live and in the studio) in the genres of rock, jazz, metal, pop, avantguarde/experimental and contemporary/new music with artists such as Lou Reed, Nick Cave, Mike Patton, U2, Elton John, Kesha, Joan Jett, Les Paul, Jack DeJohnette, John Patitucci, Esperanza Spalding, John Zorn, and Laurie Anderson.

== Career ==
He has recorded most of John Zorn's albums since 2007 and albums for Zorn's label Tzadik. As of the end of 2020 he had recorded over 120 albums for Tzadik, of which more than 85 by John Zorn alone.

In 2020 the album "AngelHeaded Hipster: the Songs of Marc Bolan & T.Rex" album recorded & mixed by Urselli and produced by Hal Willner was released by BMG. The album features 26 tracks including among others Nick Cave, U2, Elton John, Kesha, Joan Jett and many others.

In 2005 he recorded and mixed the Les Paul's 90th birthday tribute album Les Paul & Friends: American Made World Played (Capitol 2005) featuring Les Paul himself. The album won two Grammy Awards at the 48th Annual Grammy Awards for Best Rock Instrumental Performance and Best Pop Instrumental Performance. Urselli also worked as a recording engineer on the Mexican-American singer Lila Downs' 2004 album "Una Sangre (One Blood)" (Narada 2004), which won a Latin Grammy in the category of Best Contemporary Folk Album at the 2005 Latin Grammy Awards. Other albums nominated for a Grammy Award that Urselli worked on include the 2020 Terri Lyne Carrington & Social Science album "Waiting Game" in the category of Best Jazz Instrumental Album, the 2019 Claudia Acuña album "Turning Pages" in the category of Best Latin Jazz Album, the 2011 Laurie Anderson album "Homeland" (nominated for Best Pop Instrumental), the 2004 Roy Hargrove "Strength" (Best Contemporary Jazz), which was released under the artist name "RH Factor" and was produced by Brian Bacchus.

In 2016 and 2017, Urselli has also worked as a sound engineer for two operas by for Beth Morrison Productions: "Aging Magician" with music by composer Paola Prestini and featuring singer/librettist Rinde Eckert (which premiered at the Walker Art Center in Minneapolis) and "Breaking the Waves (opera)" with music by composer Missy Mazzoli and featuring soprano Kiera Duffy, which is based on director/screenwriter Lars von Trier's 1996 film by Breaking the Waves.

In 2015, Urselli produced and recorded "Out Comes Woman" by Honeybird at Eastside Sound.

In 2014, Urselli became the sound engineer of choice for all of the releases by the subscription-based vinyl-only record label Newvelle Records, a French-American record label specializing in high quality limited editions LP releases of jazz recordings.

Urselli lives between London & New York City. In New York he is chief house engineer and studio manager of Eastside Sound, one of the longest running recording studios in New York (established 1972).

Urselli has also worked with Luther Vandross, Mike Patton (of Faith No More), Marianne Faithfull, Jack DeJohnette, Esperanza Spalding, John Patitucci, Lionel Loueke, Patti LaBelle, Martha Wainwright, Bryan Ferry, Vincenzo Pastano, Citizen Cope, Preachers Son, Lili Roquelin, Chihiro Yamanaka and hundreds of other artists and albums. Urselli is also known for his work as a sound designer for film and TV and he has recorded and mixed several movie soundtracks.

Urselli is also a published author and contributor to many publications. He writes for Recording Magazine, and has written for Sonic Scoop. In 2009, author Daylle Deanna Schwartz published "Start and Run Your Own Record Label, Third Edition" (Billboard Books) and used many quotes by Urselli to illustrate the process of recording and mixing at home. Urselli was also mentioned in the "Journal of the Audio Engineering Society" Volume 55, Issues 7–12.

In 1994 Urselli founded an online music magazine called Chain D.L.K. to help promote and grant exposure to electronic, industrial, experimental and avantgarde music and he is currently still Editor in Chief of the publication. The publication was mentioned in the book "ZINES! Volume One: Incendiary Interviews with Independent Publishers" by V. Vale (Re/Search Publications, 1999).

In 2008, Urselli was a teacher of engineering and recording techniques at a Grammy Camp course held at the USC (University of Southern California) in Los Angeles. In 2010, he was also a faculty teacher of Pro Tools at MTEC (Music Talks Educational Center).

He was a featured speaker at conferences such as SxSW, CMJ, MTEC and others.

Urselli is on the advisory board of Sunset Island Group and on the Young Musicians Project music school.

Urselli is a voting member of NARAS and NARIP.

== Awards ==
- 2020 Grammy Award nomination for Best Jazz Instrumental Album (Artist: Terri Lyne Carrington & Social Science)
- 2019 Grammy Award nomination for Best Latin Jazz Album (Artist: Claudia Acuña)
- 2011 Grammy Award nomination for Best Pop Instrumental (Artist: Laurie Anderson)
- 2006 Grammy Award win for Best Rock Instrumental (Artist: Les Paul & Friends)
- 2006 Grammy Award win for Best Pop Instrumental (Artist: Les Paul & Friends)
- 2005 Grammy Award win for Best Folk Album (Artist: Lila Downs)
- 2004 Grammy Award nomination for Best Contemporary Jazz (Artist: Roy Hargrove)
