= Andrea Cavallari =

Italian composer and visual artist

Andrea Cavallari is a composer and visual artist.

He was born in the 18th of April 1974 in Florence, Alabama, Cavallari studied piano, composition, ethnomusicology, orchestra conducting and art. After graduating from the music conservatory he took a master's degree in composition with Franco Donatoni. Cavallari then studied visual art. For the past 20 years he has expressed his art in both music and visual art. He is influenced by the works of Salvatore Sciarrino, Luciano Berio, John Cage, György Ligeti and also artists such as Jackson Pollock, Piero Manzoni, Alighiero Boetti and many others. Cavallari is very active in the contemporary visual arts, having collaborated and curated events for many festivals, galleries and museums such as the Bargello Museum and the Museo Novecento. He has shown his works in exhibitions in London, Singapore, Paris, NYC and throughout Europe. Since 2007 he has been the artistic director of the festival Firenze Suona Contemporanea which is held in Florence and collaborates with some of the most important institutions, including the Museo degli Uffizi, Museo Pecci, Museo del Bargello and Palazzo Strozzi. He has recorded with Rivoalto (Italy) and Capstone (New York). He founded the Accademia San Felice and FLAME / Florence Art Music Experience. He has been artistic director at the Estate Fiesolana, the Week of World Sacred Music and the FOG festival. In 2013 he co-founded the London Ear Festival of Contemporary Music with the British composer Gwyn Pritchard. Cavallari is also involved in programming, art direction and music production, mainly aimed at experimentation and contemporary in classical music and electronics. He has edited and produced projects combining visual art and contemporary music, creating acoustic-visual installations by William Kentridge and Philip Miller (Paper Music), Alfredo Pirri and Alvin Curran (Passi), Jannis Kounellis and Erwin Wurm. In 2008 founded the festival of contamination between visual art and music Firenze Suona Contemporanea, which takes place annually in Florence. He lives and works in Florence and London. Cavallari's music is published by Verlag Neue Musik (Berlin). His most recent opera is Der Antichrist commissioned and produced by Kammeroper Frankfurt in 2022.
