= Ian Alexander (actor) =

American actor (born 2001)

- Born: April 20, 2001 (age 25); Salt Lake City, Utah, U.S.
- Occupation: Actor
- Years active: 2016–present

Ian Alexander (born April 20, 2001) is an American actor, known for their (Note: As of late 2020, Alexander adopted the use of they/them pronouns, shortly thereafter identifying as non-binary and preferring the use of they/them while accepting the alternative use of he/him. This article uses they/them throughout for consistency.) roles as Buck Vu on The OA, Lev in The Last of Us Part II, and Gray Tal on Star Trek: Discovery.

== Early life ==
Alexander was born on April 20, 2001, in Salt Lake City, Utah, to an American father and a Vietnamese mother. Due to their father's work with the Department of Defense, their family often moved and has lived in places such as Hawaii, Japan and Washington, D.C. During elementary school, they participated in community theater and chorus.

== Career ==
Alexander's debut acting role was on Netflix's The OA, where they played Buck Vu. Buck, like Alexander, is also a Vietnamese-American transgender youth and was partially based on Alexander's real experiences. They were cast from an open casting call online that spread through Tumblr. Later they were cast in the 2018 feature film Every Day, based on the book by David Levithan, playing Vic, a trans teen whom the spirit "A" inhabits for a day. In October 2017, Naughty Dog announced Alexander had joined the cast for The Last of Us Part II, the sequel to their popular video game. They played Lev, a transgender character in the game.

In June 2019, to mark the 50th anniversary of the Stonewall riots, sparking the start of the modern LGBTQ rights movement, Queerty named them one of their Pride50: "trailblazing individuals who actively ensure society remains moving towards equality, acceptance and dignity for all queer people". Similarly, Alexander was one of the cover stars for the 2019 Pride issue of them., "spotlighting three rising queer artists whose work and lives are breaking new ground for LGBTQ+ visibility". In March 2020, it was announced Alexander would star in the independent film Daughter.

In September 2020, it was announced Alexander had joined the cast of Star Trek: Discovery; they play the first transgender character played by a transgender actor in the Star Trek canon. Alexander voices Tai, one of Lunella's classmates, in Moon Girl and Devil Dinosaur. Tai is revealed to be non-binary in the episode "Check Yourself", as Lunella refers to Tai using they/them pronouns, as well as Tai admitting they are non-binary in the unaired episode "The Gatekeeper".

In September 2026, Alexander was cast as Paco in the third season of the HBO series adaptation of The Last of Us, marking their return to the franchise.

== Personal life ==
Alexander was raised in a Mormon family, but they are not a participating member and consider themself to be agnostic. They came out as transgender in 2014 and, through the course of their gender transition, identified as trans masculine while using he/him pronouns exclusively. As of September 2020, Alexander adopted the use of they/them, shortly thereafter identifying as non-binary and preferring the use of they/them while accepting the alternative use of he/him.

They received viral attention online through their photo response to a transphobic incident perpetrated by four UCLA college students.

== Filmography ==
Key	Description
†	Indicates works not yet released

Year	Title	Role	Notes	Ref.
2016–2019	The OA	Buck Vu and Michelle Vu	TV series; main cast	
2017	Déjà Vu	Lance	Short film; co-writer	
2018	Every Day	Vic	Film	
2020	The Last of Us Part II	Lev	Video game; featured voice and motion capture role	
2020–2024	Star Trek: Discovery	Gray Tal	TV series; recurring role	
2022	Daughter	Brother	Film	
2023	Moon Girl and Devil Dinosaur	Tai	Voice; animated TV series	
2027	The Last of Us †	Paco	Guest (season 3)	
