= Pteria =

Pteria may refer to:

- Pteria (Cappadocia) a town in ancient Cappadocia (in modern Turkey)
- Pteria (bivalve) a genus of bivalve molluscs, the winged oysters
