= Lamisi (musician) =

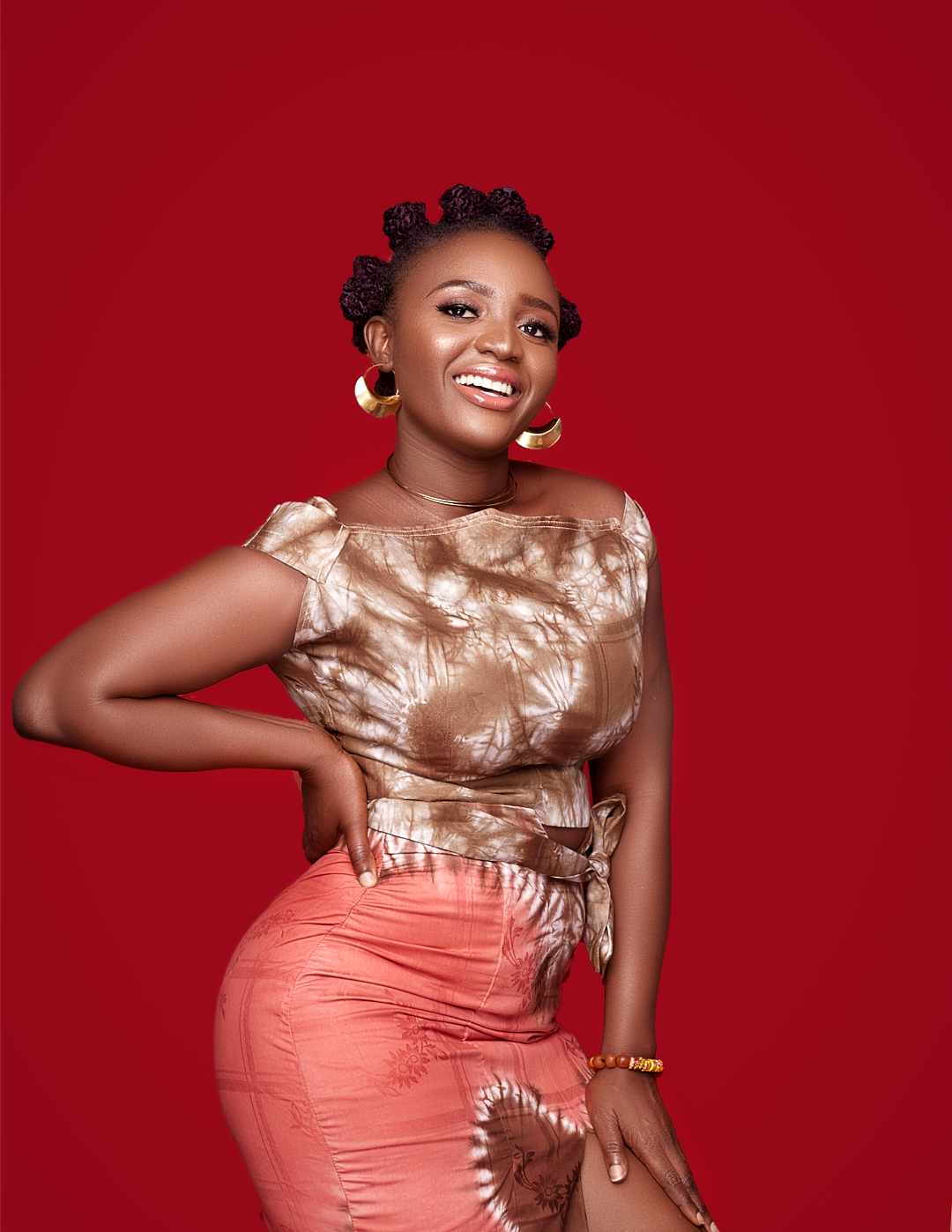
- Portrait of Lamisi

Background information
- Born: Regina Lamisi Awiniman Anabilla Akuka; Accra, Ghana
- Origin: Zebilla, Ghana
- Genres: Contemplary African Music; afro-soul; pop
- Occupations: Singer; songwriter; performer
- Years active: 2008–present
- Website: lamisimusic.com

Regina Lamisi Awiniman Anabilla Akuka (born c. 1986), known professionally as Lamisi, is a Ghanaian singer and songwriter from the Upper East Region

== Early life ==
Lamisi attended St. Peter's Methodist JSS for her basic education, and proceeded to Ashaiman Senior High School for her senior high school education. She earned a BSc degree in marketing from the University of Professional Studies, and later attended the University of Ghana for her Master of Philosophy in dance education.

== Career ==
Lamisi started her singing career as the lead singer for the Patch Bay Band, performing throughout Ghana. She was inspired to make music after listening to Miriam Makeba, Aretha Franklin, Chaka Khan, and Angelique Kidjo, among others. Lamisi has collaborated with artists such as Rocky Dawuni, Stonebwoy, Sarkodie, Samini, Amandzeba, Atongo Zimba, Becca, Afro Moses, Patoranking, and Lady May.

Lamisi released "Tanka Fanka", her debut single as a solo act. She describes her music as "Afro-fusion pop". She has also released the singles "Mr Strawberry" and "Kuul Runnings". Lamisi was featured on the reggae and dancehall compilation album released by Irie Ites Studio in 2016.

== Discography ==
=== Albums ===
- Brighter Side (2019)
- Let Us Clap (2026)

=== Singles ===
Year	Title	Production credit	Ref
2017	Tanka Fanka	Michael Adangba	
2017	Kuul Running	3Fs production	
2019	The Way You Control	Slim Drums	
2025	No Orgasm In Heaven	Wanlov the Kubolor	
2026	Come	Wanlov the Kubolor	
2026	Agol	Wanlov the Kubolor	

== Videography ==
Year	Title	Director	Ref
2017	Tanka Fanka	Slingshot HD Ghana	
2017	Kuul Runnings	Slingshot HD Ghana	
2019	The Way You Control	Yaw Skyface	
2019	Karika Tanka	Agence BK Videos	
2019	First Fool	3rd Monkey	

== Philanthropy ==
Lamisi founded the Lamisi Music Foundation a non-profit organization in Ghana which advocates for the rights of the girl child and empowers them.
