= Daughter (novel) =

2019 novel by Tamara Duda

Daughter (Ukrainian: Доця, 'dotsya'), is the debut novel by the author Tamara Duda. It was published in 2019 by Bilka Publishing House. Taking place in 2014 during the onset of the Russo-Ukrainian War, the novel follows Natalia, a businesswoman in Donetsk who goes on to become a volunteer in the war effort. Since its publication, Daughter has been translated into English, German, Latvian, Lithuanian, Macedonian, and Polish, and rights have been purchased to adapt it into a film. Daughter was named Book of the Year by BBC News Ukrainian, and in 2022 Duda was awarded the Shevchenko National Prize for the novel by Ukrainian President Volodymyr Zelenskyy, in addition to receiving recognition from the Lviv Book Forum and the Cherkasy Book Forum.
