= Preachers (musical group) =

Ghanaian gospel group

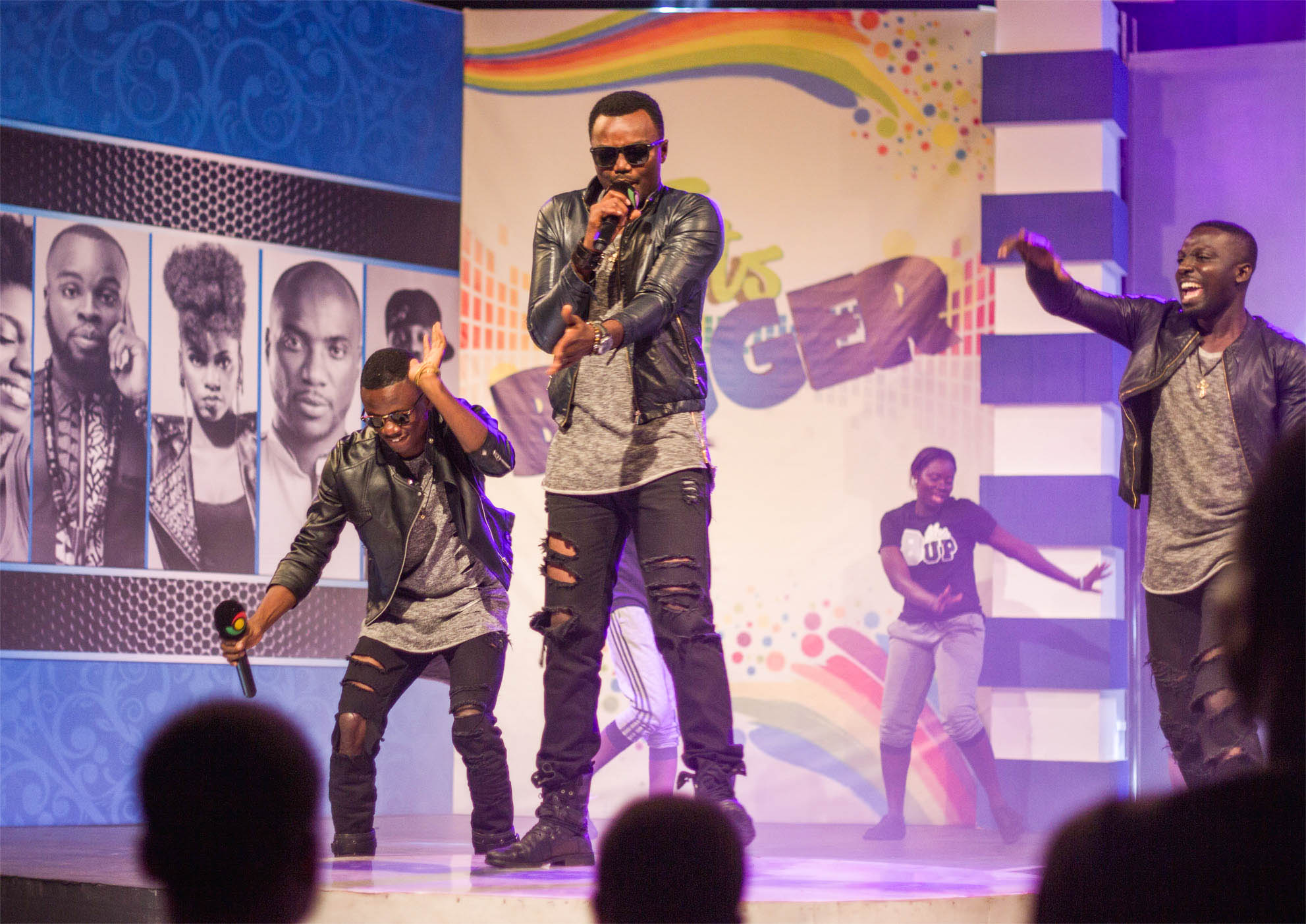
- Preachers performing at TV3's Music Music, June 19, 2015. L to R: Emani Beats, Obed Psych, Edmund Baidoo

Background information
- Origin: Ghana, West Africa
- Genres: Rap, Hip hop, Afro pop
- Years active: 2009–present
- Label: Bibles Up Records
- Members: Obed Psych; Emani Beats; Edmund Baidoo
- Past members: Dennis Enim; Michelle Majid-Michel
- Website: www.preachersgh.com

"Preachers" is a Ghanaian gospel group. The group is made up of three members, Obed Psych, Emani Beats and Edmund Baidoo. Since 2009, as pacesetters of the urban gospel movement in Ghana, they have toured locally and internationally to preach the word of God through their music. Preachers are notable pioneers of urban gospel/hiphop genre in Ghana and continue to set the pace for the new generation of gospel music.

== History ==
=== Group formation ===
Preachers started as a group of five namely Michelle Majid-Michel, Dennis Enim (lead singer at the time), Obed Awelinga-Nzuh(also known as Obed Psych, now lead singer of the group), Edmund Baidoo and Emmanuel Awuni (also known as Emani Beats). They came together as a group in 2009 to form a gospel rap group which they together named PREACHERS. The name Preachers was derived from the bible verse Mark 16:15 which says "Go ye into the world and Preach the gospel to all creation". They recorded their first mixtape "Very Special" in 2010 with almost all songs produced by record producer and multi-instrumentalist KODA.

=== Debut album and breakthrough ===
Not long in time, Michelle opted out of the group to focus on her education. The remaining four Dennis, Obed Psych, Emani Beats and Edmund continued to work together as a team and blew up with their debut album "Mark 16:15" in 2012. This led to their breakthrough in the music industry as their hit song Go Hard topped local charts, won them the Discovery of the Year award at the 2012 Ghana Gospel Music Awards and Most Wanted Rap Song at the 2013 Christian Community Music Awards. Go Hard's music video also featured on top Christian Hip Hop online magazine Rapzilla.

In 2013, Dennis silently left the group and Preachers released a music video for their song "E Dey Love Me" which brought controversies from the cost and concept of the video to the mysterious absence of Dennis in the video. Preachers have since not officially said a word about his absence. However, Preachers describe themselves today as the interminable trio which concludes that the group is now a trio.

The group continued to grow, winning several awards such as Afro Rap Artist(s) of the Year at the Africa Gospel Music Awards in the United Kingdom. They performed on bigger platforms and put together a group called "Team Bibles Up" which consists of fans of Preachers. Their Go Hard Tour eventually evolved into the Bibles Up Tour which covered several more schools.

=== Bibles Up Foundation ===
In 2014, Preachers launched their foundation called the Bibles Up Foundation, which was launched alongside their second album "The Fearless Project"

=== The Fearless Project ===
In August 2014, The Fearless Project, which has been the greatest album of Preachers so far was launched at Holiday Inn Hotel in Accra. The Album title is based on the bible verse 2 Timothy 1:7 "For God has not given us the spirit of fear but of power and of love and of sound mind". The album has been described as a multiple hit album because it won them several local and international awards and nominations. Their song No Juju won "Most Wanted Rap Song of the year at the Christian Community Music Awards 2014" and "Most Popular Song at the Jamming Jesus Festival and Honors 2015", The video for their song "Meyi W'aye" which featured Noble Nketsiah also won "Best International Music Video" at the Gospel Music Awards Italy 2014 and "Video of the Year" at the Jamming Jesus Festival and Honors 2015

=== International tour ===
In May 2016, Preachers performed to a multitude in Pretoria, South Africa at the Conquerors Through Christ Ministries auditorium as part of their Bibles Up International Tour. In December 2015, the trio performed at Kenya's popular "Totally Sold Out Concert" at the Kenyatta International Convention Centre in Nairobi and organized a conference dubbed "Ghana Meets Kenya Summit" at the Nairobi Cinema.

== Albums, mixtapes and singles ==
- 2022: Fallin' ft. Dan Ali (single)
- 2021: Closet (single)
- 2020: Amen (single)
- 2020: Control ft. Ma Name Is Aaron (single)
- 2020: It's Working (single)
- 2019: X
- 2017: Level Up
- 2014: The Fearless Project
- 2012: Mark 16:15
- 2010: Very Special

== Music videos ==
- 2020: Control
- 2020: Grace Sor
- 2017: Above
- 2016: Together As One
- 2015: Crazy
- 2014: Meyi W'aye ft. Noble Nketsiah
- 2014: E Dey Love Me
- 2012: My Days ft. Isaac Ogoe
- 2012: Go Hard ft. Christ Image

== Awards ==
Year	Award	Category	Outcome
2019	Africa Gospel Awards	Rap Hip Hop Artiste Of The Year	Nominated
2019	Africa Gospel Awards	Rap Hip Hop Song Of The Year	Nominated
2019	Africa Gospel Awards	Afropop Song Of The Year	Nominated
2019	Africa Gospel Awards	Group Of The Year	Nominated
2019	Ghana Urban Gospel Music Awards	Artist of the Year	Nominated
2019	Ghana Urban Gospel Music Awards	UG Song of the Year	Nominated
2019	Ghana Urban Gospel Music Awards	Album of the Year (Level Up)	Nominated
2019	Ghana Urban Gospel Music Awards	Group of the Year	Nominated
2019	Ghana Urban Gospel Music Awards	Music Video of the Year	Won
2018	Shine Awards	Group of the Year	Nominated
2018	Africa Gospel Music & Media Awards	Afro Rap Artist(s) of the Year	Nominated
2017	Groove Awards	Western Africa Artist of the Year	Nominated
2017	Africa Gospel Music & Media Awards	Afro Rap Artist of Excellence	Nominated
2016	Ghana Music Awards UK	Gospel Artist of the Year	Nominated
2016	Groove Awards	Western Africa Artist of the Year	Nominated
2016	Christian Community Music Awards	Most Wanted Rap Song	Won
2016	Vodafone Ghana Music Awards	Gospel Artist(s) of the Year	Nominated
2016	Vodafone Ghana Music Awards	Best Group of the Year	Nominated
2016	Vodafone Ghana Music Awards	Music Video of the Year (Crazy)	Nominated
2015	MTN 4Syte TV Music Video Awards	Gospel Video of the Year	Nominated
2015	Jamming Jesus Festival and Honors	Album of the Year (The Fearless Project)	Won
2015	Jamming Jesus Festival and Honors	Most Popular Song of the Year (No Juju)	Won
2015	Jamming Jesus Festival and Honors	Most Influential Artist	Nominated
2015	Jamming Jesus Festival and Honors	Music Video of the Year (Meyi W'aye)	Won
2015	Jamming Jesus Festival and Honors	Collaboration of the Year(Meyi W'aye)	Nominated
2014	Gospel Music Awards Italy	International Music Video of The Year (E Dey Love Me)	Won
2014	Gospel Music Awards Italy	International Group of the Year	Won
2014	Gospel Music Awards Italy	International Song of the Year (No Juju)	Nominated
2014	Gospel Music Awards Italy	International Gospel HipHop/Rap of the Year	Nominated
2014	Christian Community Music Awards	Most Wanted Rap Song of the Year	Won
2014	Africa Gospel Music Awards	Best Video (E Dey Love Me)	Nominated
2014	Africa Gospel Music Awards	Afro Rap Artist(s) of the Year	Won
2014	Africa Gospel Music Awards	Group of the Year	Nominated
2014	Africa Gospel Music Awards	Video of the Year (My Days)	Nominated
2013	Christian Community Music Awards	Most Wanted Rap Song of the Year (Go Hard)	Won
2013	Black Entertainment, Fashion, Film and Television Awards	International Artist of the Year	Nominated
2012	Ghana Gospel Music Awards	Discovery of the Year	Won
2012	Africa Gospel Music Awards	Afro Rap Artist(s) of the Year	Nominated

== Concerts and tours ==
- 2017 Level Up Album Launch
- 2016 Preachers And Buddies Concert
- 2016 Preachers in Pretoria, South Africa
- 2016 Ghana Meets Kenya Summit, Nairobi, Kenya
- 2015 Crazy Video Premiere Party
- 2015 Bibles Up School Tour
- 2014 Preachers at 5 Anniversary Concert
- 2014 The Fearless Project Album Launch
- 2013 Bibles Up Tour
- 2012 Go Hard Campus Tour
