= Preacher-man =

A preacher-man is a male preacher.

Preacher-man, Preacherman, Preacher Man, may refer to:

== Music ==
=== Songs ===
- "Preacher Man", a 1991 song and single by Bananarama off the album Pop Life
- "Preacher Man" (The Driver Era song), by the Driver Era, 2018
- "Preacher Man" (Kanye West song), 2025
- "Preacher Man", 1987 song by Fields of the Nephilim off the album Dawnrazor
- "Preacher Man", 1993 song by Soulscraper off the album Neo-Anarcho
- "Preacher Man", 1999 song and single by Lynyrd Skynyrd off the album Edge of Forever
- "Preacher Man", 1999 song by Shaman's Harvest off the album Last Call for Goose Creek
- "Preacherman", 1976 song by Little Jimmy Dickens
- "Preacherman", 2015 single by Melody Gardot

=== Albums ===
- Preacher Man, 1973 album by The Impressions; see The Impressions discography
- Preacher Man, 2012 album by Twitching Tongues

== Other uses ==
- Robert Daniels (boxer) (born 1968; ring name: "Preacherman"), U.S. boxer
- Preacherman, 1971 U.S. film

== See also ==
- Preacher (disambiguation)
- Man (disambiguation)
- Son of a Preacher Man (disambiguation)
