= XORKO Collaborative Arts Movement =

- Founded: November 15, 2011
- Founder: Evagoras Bekiaris and Nico Stephou
- Location: Cyprus
- Official website: Xorko.com (link dead)

XORKO Collaborative Arts Movement was a cultural and artists' movement based in Cyprus that began on November 15, 2011, originally by Evagoras Bekiaris and Nico Stephou. XORKO in Cypriot Greek translates to village. The word was used metaphorically as a way to promote the idea of an environment similar to one that can be found in a village; and hence to create a sense of belonging between the members of the movement. Artistic liberation being a main aim of XORKO, was seen by the movement as only possible within a framework that could facilitate a roof for Cypriot artists to collaborate in a "Do It Together" context, where XORKO acts as a platform/roof enabling all members to expand themselves in the context of art collaborations and not limit their art to just their personal forms of expression. XORKO promoted the notions of non-profiting and no sponsoring, opposing the "industrialization of music" implemented by multinational record labels and other companies that promote the commodification of art.

XORKO produced compilations with various music artists through this collaboration process, which it uploaded and distributed through SoundCloud. While XORKO had held various art events since its formation, it received wider coverage after holding two non-profit art festivals at Arminou village in July 2012 and August 2013, run by volunteers.
