= Daughter (2022 film) =

- Directed by: Corey Deshon
- Written by: Corey Deshon
- Produced by: Corey Deshon; Vivien Ngô; Tracy Chitupatham; Jes Vu
- Starring: Casper Van Dien; Elyse Dinh; Vivien Ngô; Ian Alexander; Megan Le; Edward Stasik
- Cinematography: Hana Kitasei
- Edited by: Nicholas Larrabure
- Music by: David Strother
- Production company: Dark Star Pictures
- Release date: August 26, 2022 (The Prince Charles Cinema)
- Country: United States
- Language: English

Daughter is a 2022 American psychological thriller film written and directed by Corey Deshon in his feature directorial debut. It stars Casper Van Dien, Vivien Ngô, Elyse Dinh, and Ian Alexander. The film follows a young woman who is kidnapped and inducted into a bizarre, isolated family as their new surrogate daughter.

Shot on 16mm film, Daughter premiered at the FrightFest Film Festival in August 2022 before receiving a limited theatrical and video-on-demand release in the United States on February 10, 2023, by Dark Star Pictures. The film received generally positive reviews, with critics praising its atmosphere and Van Dien's performance.

== Plot ==
A young woman (credited as "Sister") is kidnapped by a man wearing a gas mask ("Father") and taken to an isolated home. She is informed that she has been chosen to replace the family's previous "Daughter," who was recently killed during an escape attempt. Father, a patriarchal figure with dogmatic and traditionalist views, explains that Sister must fulfill her role to provide a sense of normalcy for his son ("Brother"), an impressionable youth whom Father claims is being protected from a toxic, ruined world outside.

Under the watchful eye of "Mother," Sister is forced to follow strict household rules, which include role-playing family dynamics and adhering to Father's religious-tinged lectures. Failure to comply results in physical punishment or being chained in the garage. As Sister navigates the group's twisted logic, she discovers that Mother and Brother are also living in a state of fear and manipulation.

Sister forms a tentative bond with Brother, teaching him about the world beyond the house, and with Mother, with whom she shares a common Vietnamese heritage. She eventually learns that the "toxic" atmosphere Father describes is a psychological construct used to keep the family captive. The tension reaches a breaking point as Sister attempts to dismantle Father's control and lead a desperate escape, leading to a violent confrontation that reveals the dark fate of the previous daughters who inhabited the home.

== Cast ==
- Casper Van Dien as Father, the controlling patriarch of the household.
- Vivien Ngô as Sister, the kidnapped protagonist forced into the family.
- Elyse Dinh as Mother, who maintains the house and Father's rules.
- Ian Alexander as Brother, the naive and sheltered son.
- Megan Le as Daughter, the previous surrogate who appeared in the film's opening.

== Production ==
Daughter marked the feature directorial debut of Corey Deshon, who also wrote and produced the film. Deshon wrote the screenplay prior to the COVID-19 pandemic, though the film's themes of isolation and manufactured reality drew later comparisons to the global lockdowns. The Greek film Dogtooth and the thriller 10 Cloverfield Lane were cited as tonal inspirations.

The film was shot on 16mm film to achieve a grainy, timeless aesthetic that Deshon felt complemented the claustrophobic and "eccentric cult" atmosphere of the story. The production was a micro-budget project filmed primarily in a single location to maximize resources. The casting of Vivien Ngô and Elyse Dinh allowed for the inclusion of Vietnamese dialogue, which Deshon used to create a layer of intimacy and secrecy between the characters that Father cannot penetrate.

== Release ==
The film had its world premiere at the FrightFest Film Festival in London on August 26, 2022. Dark Star Pictures acquired the North American distribution rights and released the film in select theaters and on digital platforms on February 10, 2023. In the United Kingdom and Ireland, it was released on February 20, 2023.

== Reception ==
On the review aggregator website Rotten Tomatoes, 94% of 18 critics' reviews are positive. Metacritic, which uses a weighted average, assigned the film a score of 59 out of 100 based on 5 critics, indicating "mixed or average reviews."

Simon Abrams of RogerEbert.com gave the film two out of four stars, calling it an "eccentric cult/hostage thriller" and praising the long takes and 16mm cinematography. Bloody Disgusting praised Deshon's debut, noting that it "breathes much-needed new life into an often tropey subgenre of horror."
