= Preacher's kid =

Child of a preacher

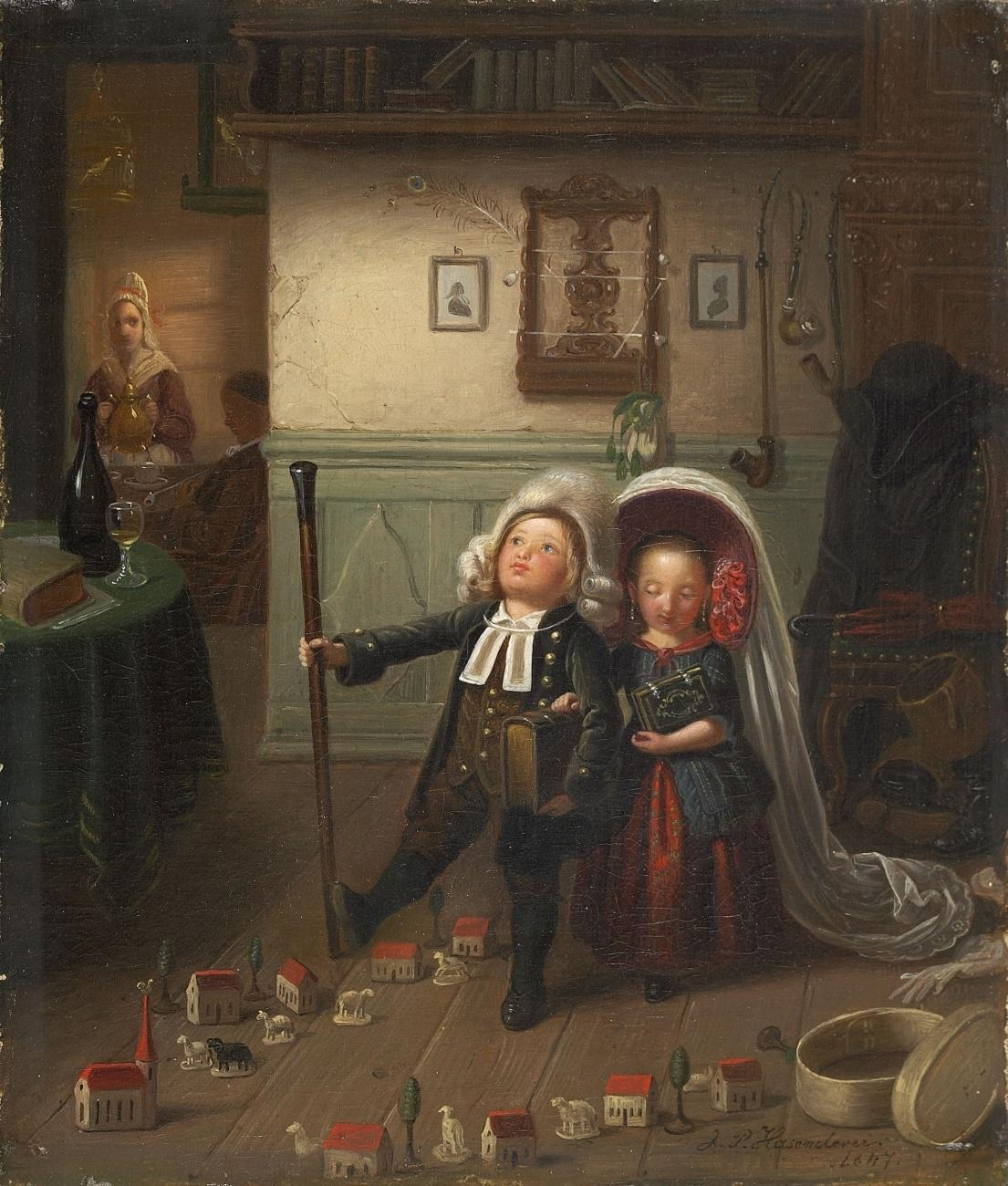
German Pfarrerskinder (preacher's kids) play "church", in a painting by Johann Peter Hasenclever, c. 1847.

Preacher's kid is the child of a preacher, pastor, deacon, vicar, lay leader, priest, minister or other similar church leader. Although the phrase can be used in a purely descriptive way, it may also be used as a stereotype. In some countries, a preacher's kid is referred to as a vicar's son/daughter.

== Phenomenon ==
Children of clergy often experience pressure due to the expectations placed on them, and may develop feelings of isolation and inner conflict as a result. Parental workload (which, by definition, includes working on the weekend) may also be a source of stress. Some writers suggest that there is a "preacher's kid syndrome", in which children of clergy reject religion and the church.

Such rebellious children of the clergy are a stock figure in the Southern literature of the United States, and this view is seen as a stereotype. One literary example occurs in Eugene O'Neill's play The Iceman Cometh when the traveling salesman Hickey describes his life: "You see, even as a kid I was always restless. I had to keep on the go. You’ve heard the old saying, 'Ministers' sons are sons of guns.' Well, that was me, and then some." Other writers note that children of the clergy (both Christian and Jewish) may often become clergy themselves, such as Martin Luther King Jr., son of Martin Luther King Sr.; and Franklin Graham, son of Billy Graham.

Children of clergy may be more exposed than their peers to the defining events of life. Former British Prime Minister Gordon Brown recalled that he learned much about life, death, poverty, injustice and unemployment as the son of a Church of Scotland minister. The "preacher's kid" phenomenon has been connected with the related phenomenon of "military brats" (children of active-duty military personnel). Children of preachers who are missionaries (missionary kids) may also be third culture kids.

== Stereotypes ==
There are two different stereotypes of the preacher's kid: in one, they are perfectly angelic role models, in the other they are rebels at the opposite extreme. The existence of these stereotypes is a source of pressure on children of clergy.

Examples of the negative stereotype include the preacher's son from Maine in the film Gettysburg, described as the "best darn cusser I've ever heard" and Jessica Lovejoy in the "Bart's Girlfriend" episode of The Simpsons, as well as the character Ariel in the 1984 film Footloose. On the sitcom Three's Company, the character Chrissy Snow played by Suzanne Somers played off a variety of stereotypes including the "dumb blonde", but also as daughter of Reverend Luther Snow (Peter Mark Richman), the character – as well as much of the show's humor – was developed around aspects of Chrissy's innocence and naïvety based on a stereotype of her religious upbringing in small town America. The TV series 7th Heaven is also a good example of the pastor's kid stereotype. The Camden family father, Eric (Stephen Collins), is a minister, and he and his wife Annie (Catherine Hicks) have seven children. Sometimes they are perfect angels but most of the time the show displays the trials that the family go through as the children grow up, and often the children are criticized because of who their father is. Lifetime reality TV series Preachers' Daughters follows the lives of Christian preacher's daughters and their families.

An enduring image from popular music is presented in the hit song "Son of a Preacher Man," a ballad of a woman remembering her first sexual experiences with the son of the local church’s preacher. The song describes the minister's son as a "sweet-talkin' son of a preacher man", a boy who woos and seduces the singer as an adolescent. Because the young man is a ‘preacher’s kid’, the implication is that the singer’s family believes him to be of no moral threat to their daughter, unlike other young men. This is further supported by the lyrics “The only one who could ever reach me/Was the son of a preacher man/The only boy who could ever teach me/Was the son of a preacher man." Several singers and entertainers have covered the song including Dusty Springfield, whom it is most synonymous with, and Aretha Franklin. It was Franklin, who was the daughter of a Baptist minister and had given birth to her first child at age 12 and her second child at age 15, who was the inspiration for “Son of a Preacher Man” songwriters John Hurley and Ronnie Wilkins. It is unknown if Wilkins or Hurley knew of Franklin’s personal life when writing the lyrics, as Franklin did not like to discuss her early life or first two children in public, or if it was merely coincidental.

The "preacher's daughter" is also a pervasive negative stereotype ascribed to female children that has a particular set of connotations, often sexual, rebellious, or dark in nature. The stereotype is typically suggestive of a dual life: one lived as the expected descendant of piety and the other lived wild, outside of the morals of religion, cloaked in secrecy. Songs such as "Preacher's Daughter" by American R&B singer-songwriter Anthony Hamilton exhibit this role: "She had a habit that she couldn't really stop, needed money so she had to hit the block, nobody knew it so she steady had to play a role, went to church, but surely tearin' up her soul... she was a Preacher's Daughter."

== Other terms ==
In Scotland, to be a "child of the manse" is considered very influential on a person's upbringing.

In German, the terms Pfarrerskind and Priesterkind are used to refer to children of clergy.

Greek surnames with the prefix Papa- and Armenian surnames with the prefix Ter- or Der- refer to people who are the descendants of clergy.

== See also ==
- List of children of clergy
- Preachers' Daughters, docuseries
- Preacher's Sons, docufilm
- Child preacher
