= Sound art =

Art discipline that uses sound as a medium

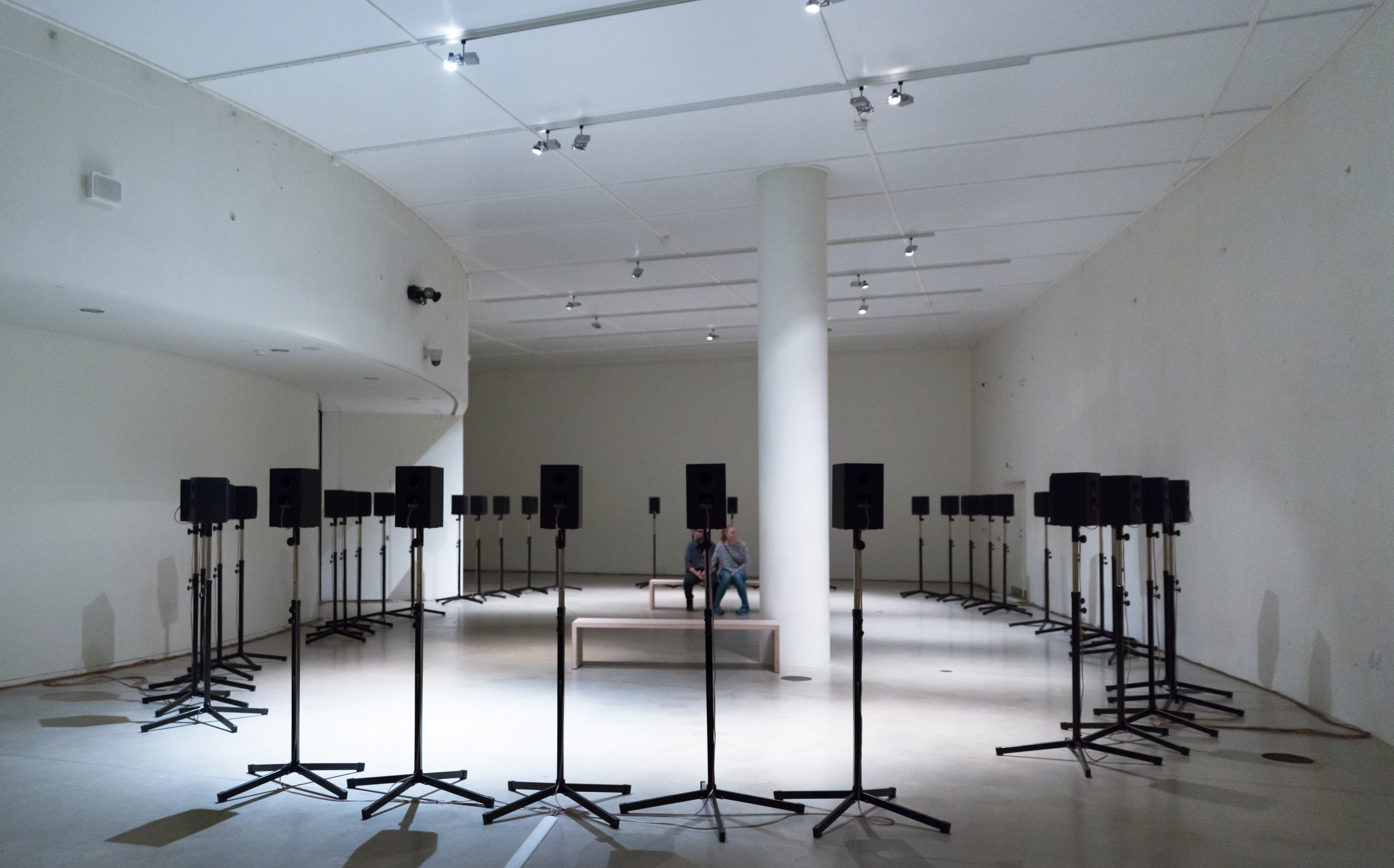
Janet Cardiff's Forty Part Motet (2001) in the ARoS Aarhus Kunstmuseum in Denmark

Sound art is an artistic activity in which sound is utilized as a primary time-based medium or material. Like many genres of contemporary art, sound art may be interdisciplinary in nature, or be used in hybrid forms. According to Brandon LaBelle, sound art as a practice "harnesses, describes, analyzes, performs, and interrogates the condition of sound and the process by which it operates."

In Western art, early examples include the Futurist Luigi Russolo's Intonarumori noise intoners (1913), and subsequent experiments by dadaists, surrealists, the Situationist International, and in Fluxus events and other Happenings. Because of the diversity of sound art, there is often debate about whether sound art falls within the domains of visual art or experimental music, or both. Other artistic lineages from which sound art emerges are conceptual art, minimalism, site-specific art, sound poetry, electro-acoustic music, spoken word, avant-garde poetry, sound scenography, and experimental theatre.

== Origin of term ==
According to Bernhard Gál's research, the first published use of the term was found in Something Else Press on the cover of their 1974 Yearbook. The first use as the title of an exhibition at a major museum was 1979's Sound Art at the Museum of Modern Art in New York (MoMA), featuring Maggi Payne, Connie Beckley, and Julia Heyward. The curator, Barbara London defined sound art as, "more closely allied to art than to music, and are usually presented in the museum, gallery, or alternative space."

Commenting on an exhibition called Sound/Art at the SculptureCenter in New York City in 1984 art historian Don Goddard noted: "It may be that sound art adheres to curator Hellermann's perception that 'hearing is another form of seeing,' that sound has meaning only when its connection with an image is understood...The conjunction of sound and image insists on the engagement of the viewer, forcing participation in real space and concrete, responsive thought, rather than illusionary space and thought."

== Sound installation ==
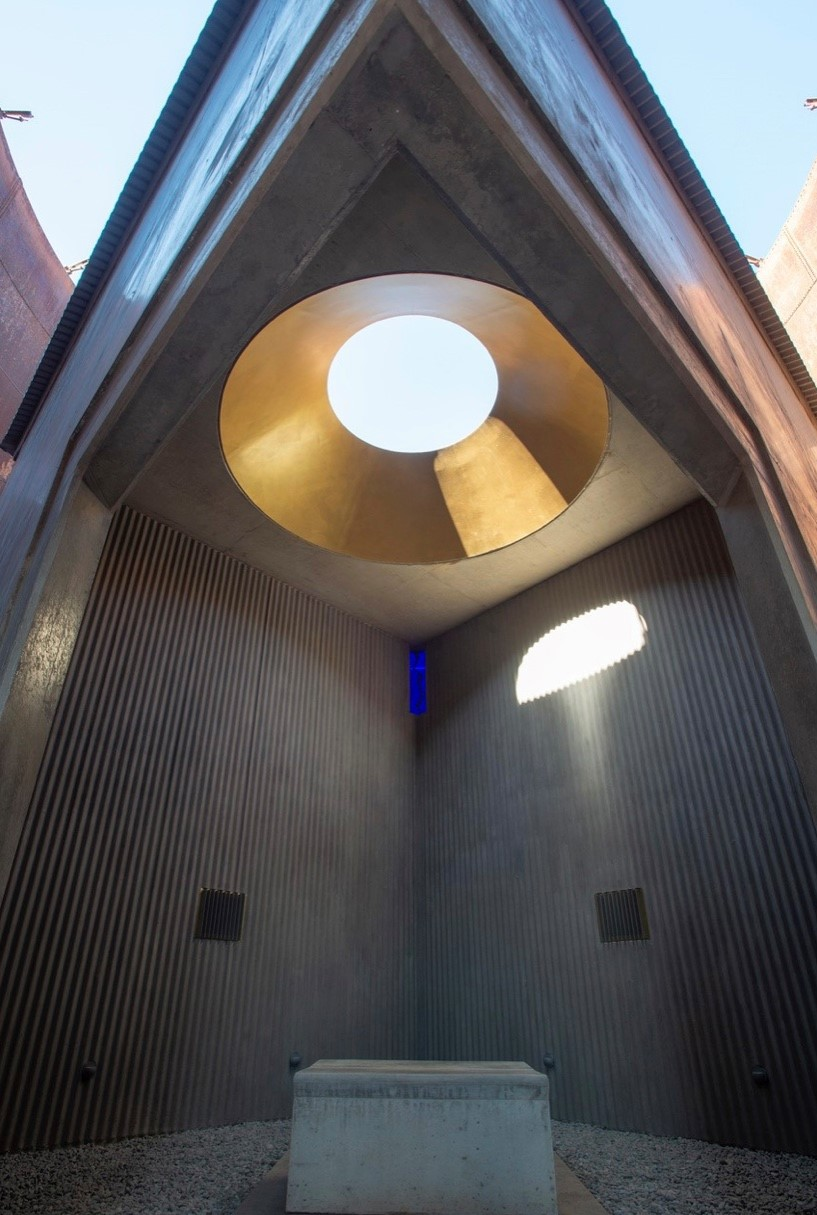
Georges Lentz's 43-hour String Quartet(s) at the Cobar Sound Chapel (2022), with loudspeakers in the four walls

Sound installation is an intermedia and time-based art form. It is an expansion of an art installation in the sense that it includes the sound element and therefore the time element. The main difference with a sound sculpture is that a sound installation has a three-dimensional space and the axes with which the different sound objects are being organized are not exclusively internal to the work, but also external. A work of art is an installation only if it makes a dialog with the surrounding space. A sound installation is usually site-specific, but sometimes it can be readapted to other spaces. It can be made either in closed or open spaces, and context is fundamental in determining how a sound installation will be aesthetically perceived. The difference between a regular art installation and a sound installation is that the latter contains a time element which gives the visiting public the option to stay longer to explore the development of the sound over time. This temporal factor also gives the audience an incentive to explore the space more thoroughly and investigate the disposition of the different sounds in space.

Sound installations sometimes use interactive art technology (computers, sensors, mechanical and kinetic devices, etc.), but they can also simply use sound sources placed at different points in space (such as speakers), or acoustic instrument materials such as piano strings played by a performer or by the public. In the context of museums, this combination of interactive digital technology and multi-channel speaker distribution is sometimes referred to as sound scenography.

=== Sound structure in sound installations ===
1. The simplest sound form is a repeating sound loop. This is mostly used in Ambient music-like art, and in this case the sound is not the determinant factor of the art work.
2. The most used sound structure is the open form, since the public can decide to experience a sound installation for just a few minutes or for a longer period of time. This obliges the artist to construct a sound organization that is capable of working well in both cases.
3. There is also the possibility to have a linear sound structure, where sound develops in the same way as in a musical composition. This type of structure can be seen in interactive sound installations like "The Zone," created by the collaborative group Volumetric Units, which explores the phenomenological experience of hyperreal cyberspace

== Sound sculpture ==
Sound sculpture is an intermedia and time-based art form in which sculpture or any kind of art object produces sound, or the reverse (in the sense that sound is manipulated in such a way as to create a sculptural as opposed to temporal form or mass). Most often sound sculpture artists were primarily either visual artists or composers, not having started out directly making sound sculpture.

Cymatics and kinetic art have influenced sound sculpture. Sound sculpture is sometimes site-specific. Bill Fontana's research on urban sound sculpture delves into the concept of shifting ambient noise music within cityscapes to produce distinct auditory encounters. Through this approach, he modifies the surrounding soundscape, impacting how listeners perceive their environment while highlighting both the auditory and visual elements of a particular space.

Sound Artist and Professor of Art at Claremont Graduate University Michael Brewster described his own works as "Acoustic Sculptures" as early as 1970. Grayson described sound sculpture in 1975 as "the integration of visual form and beauty with magical, musical sounds through participatory experience."

=== Notable sound sculptures ===
- Blackpool High Tide Organ
- Gesundheit Radio
- Sea organ
- Singing Ringing Tree (Panopticons)
- A Sound Garden
- Golden Gate Bridge#Wind
- Cloud harp

== Gallery ==
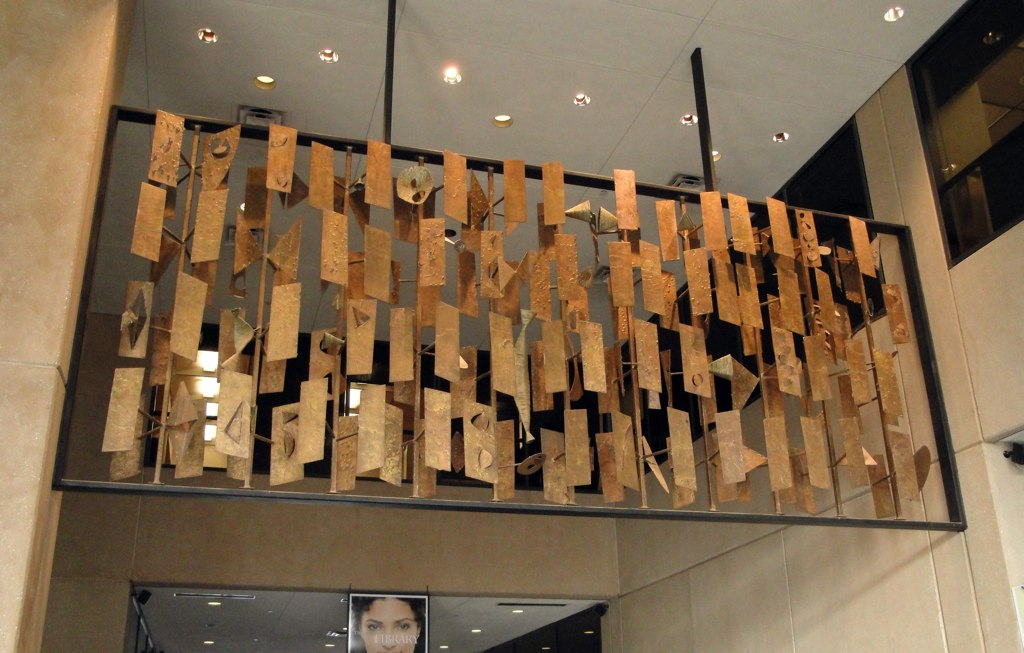
Harry Bertoia, Textured Screen, 1954

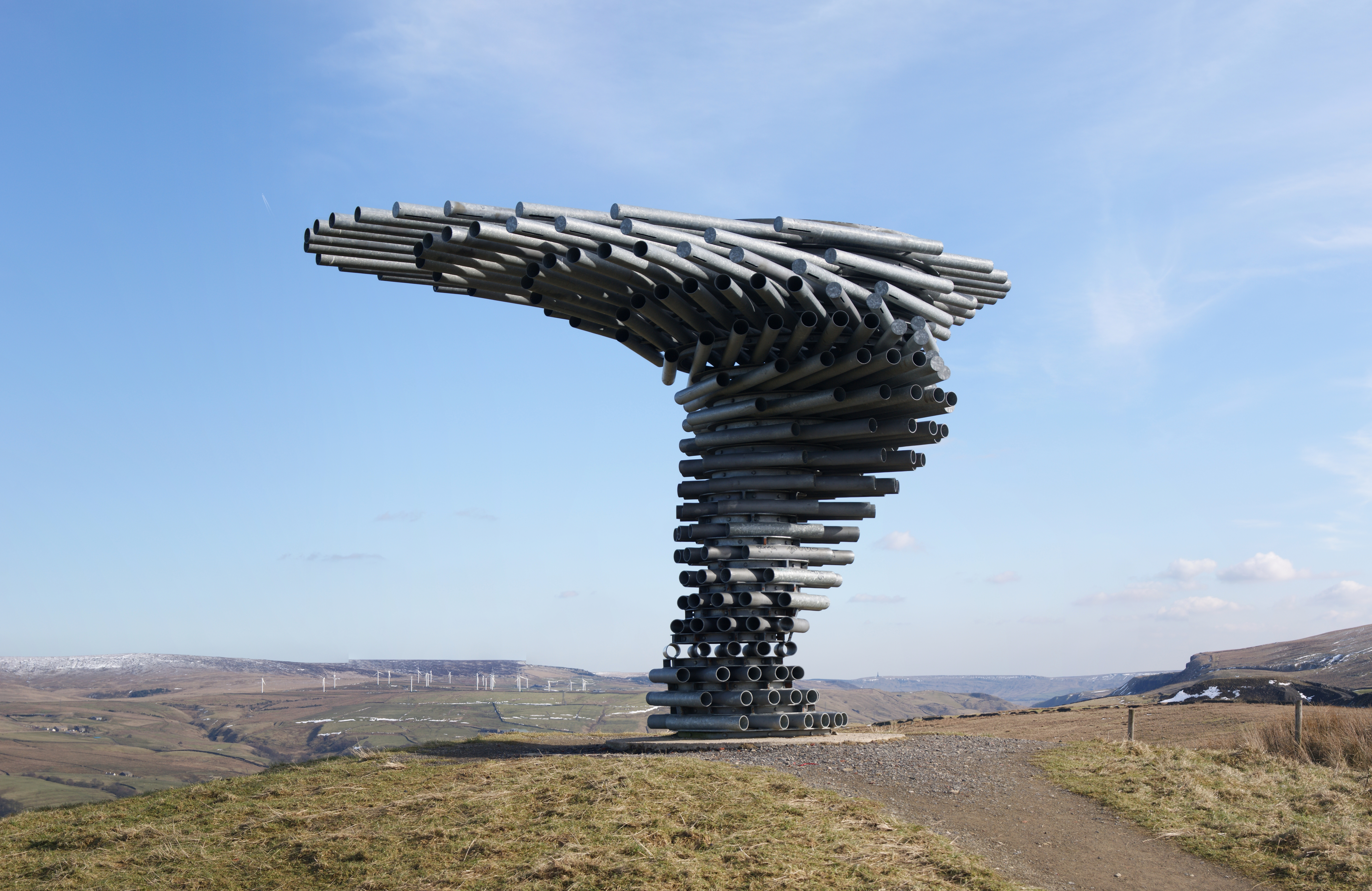
Panopticon: The Singing Ringing Tree

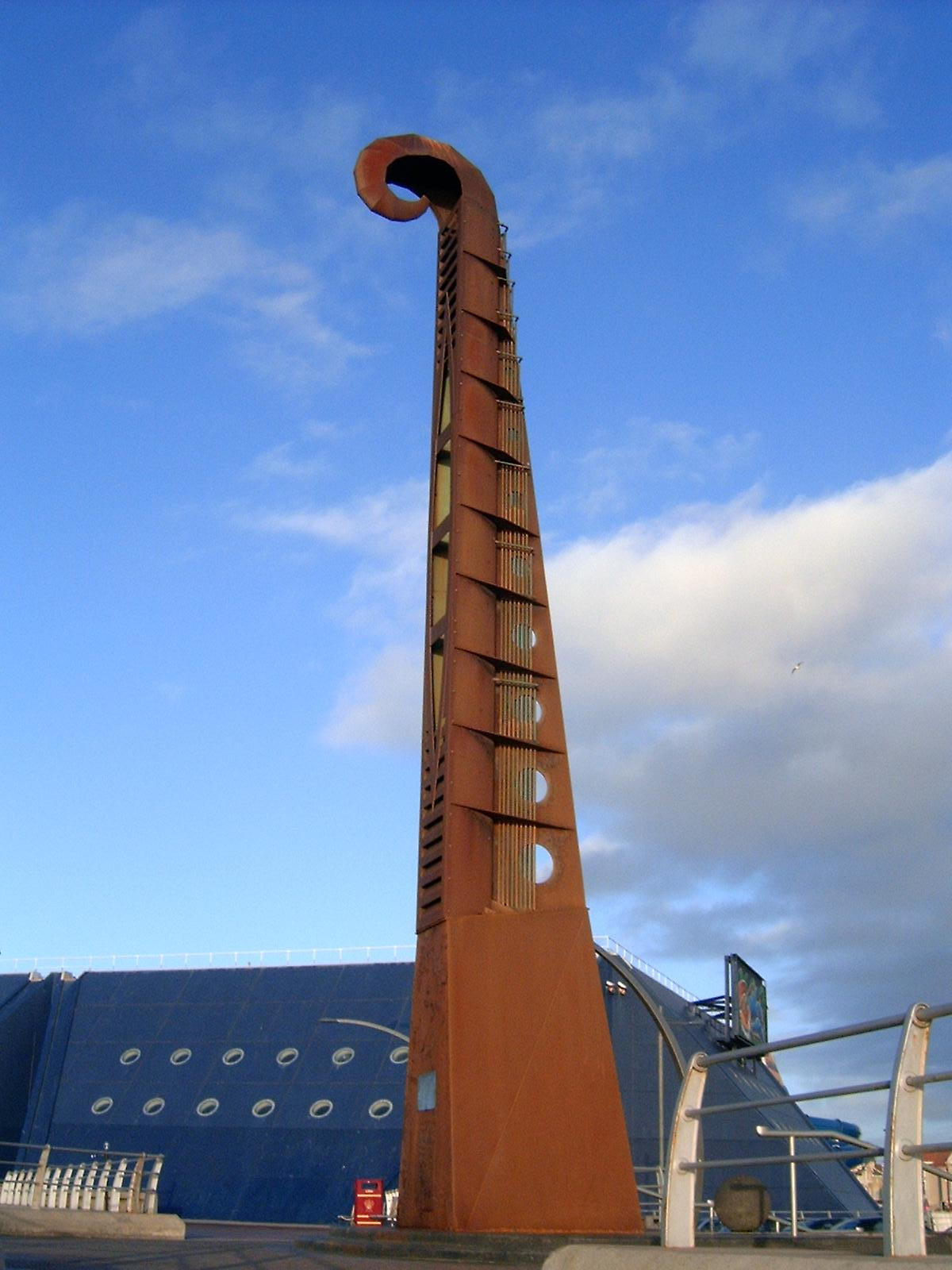
The Blackpool High Tide Organ

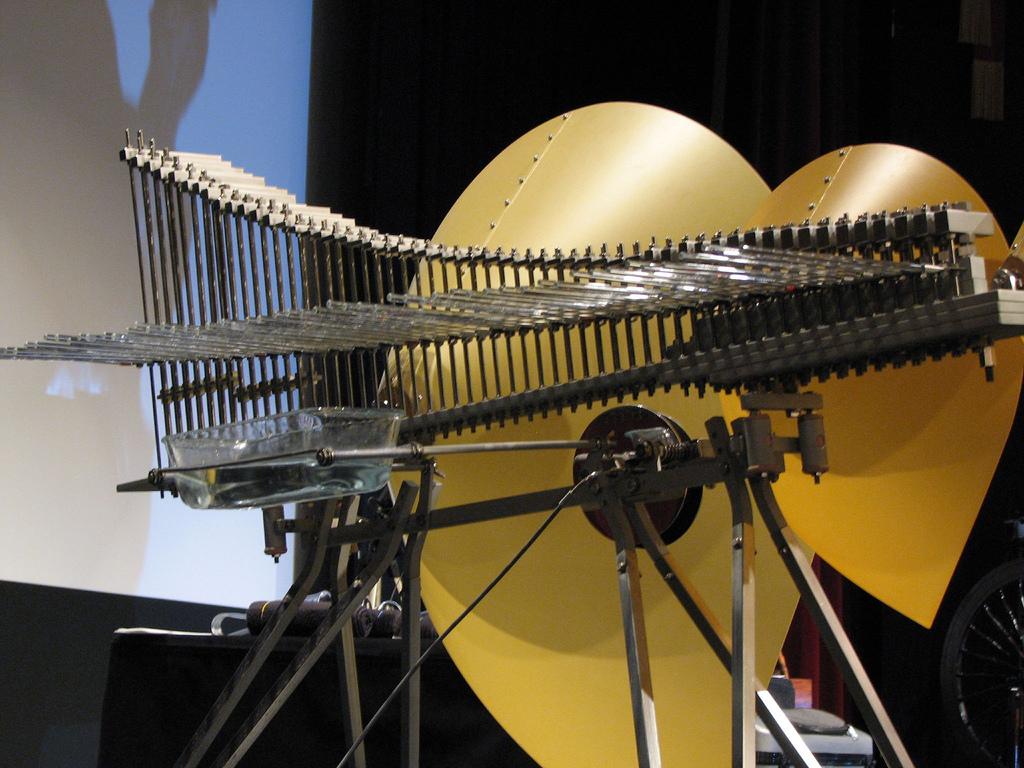
The Cristal Baschet

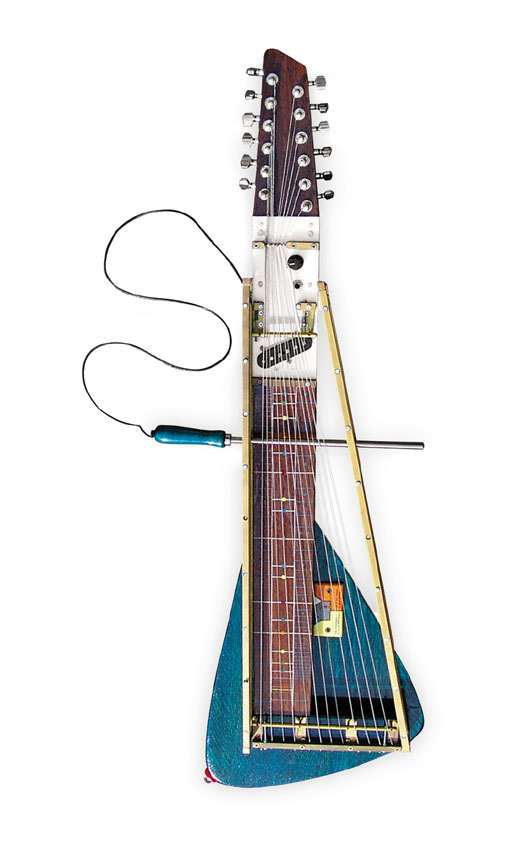
Yuri Landman, Moodswinger, 2006

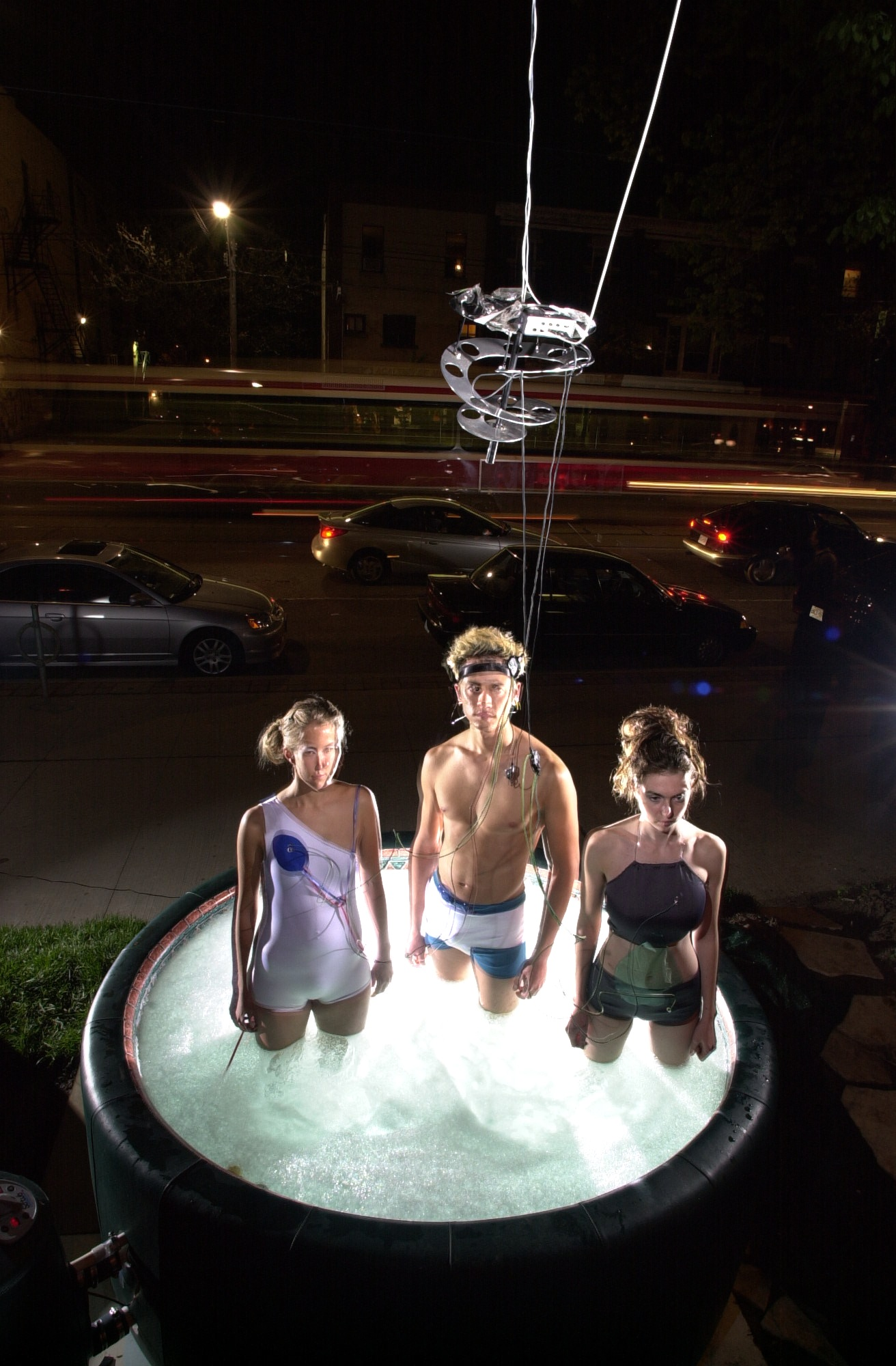
2 electrocardiophones & electroencephalophone

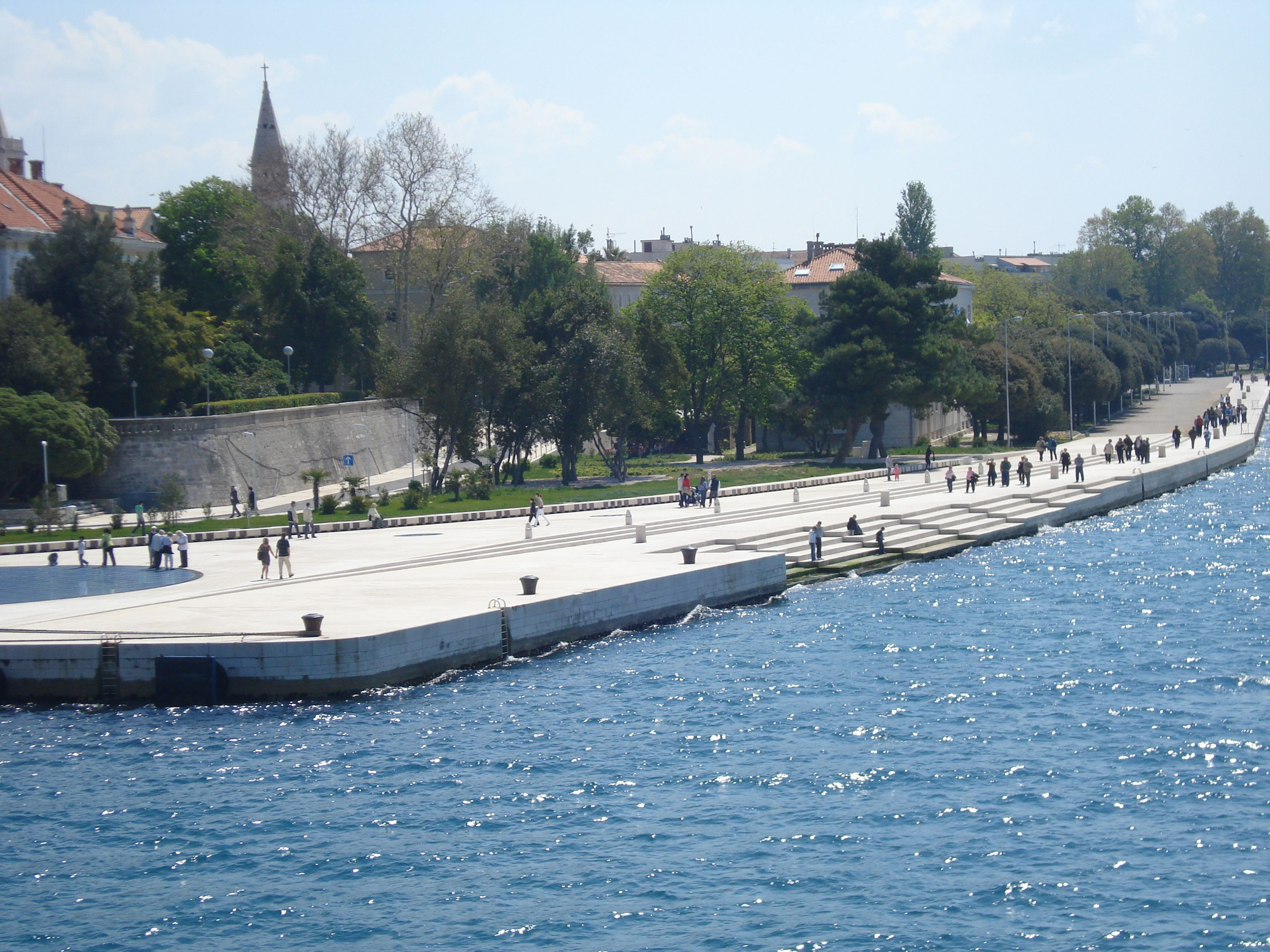
Bašić's sea organ

== See also ==
- List of sound art organizations and festivals
- List of sound artists
- Acousmonium
- Acoustic ecology
- Work of art
- Audium
- Cassette culture
- Electronic music
- Fluxus
- Installation art
- Intermedia
- NIME
- Noise music
- Odonien
- Performance art
- Planephones
- Radio art
- Site-specific art
- Sonification
- Sound effect
- Sound poetry
- Soundscape
- Soundwalk
- Tellus Audio Cassette Magazine
- Video game music
- Visual music
- Sound map
