= Lydgalleriet =

Sound based art gallery in Bergen, Norway

Coordinates: 60°23′48″N 5°18′50″E

Lydgalleriet is a non-commercial gallery for sound based art practices, situated in the centre of Bergen. The gallery explores today’s plethora of experimental sound based art and auditive cultures through exhibitions, concerts, performance and interventions in public space. Lydgalleriet exhibits national and international artists and initiates local art production. The range of projects is wide and covers among other forms, audio art, installations, speaker concerts and performances and instrument demonstrations. Exhibited artists include, among others Christian Marclay, Peter Vogel, Zimoun, Alvin Lucier, Pierre Henry, Robert Henke and Chris Watson.

Since November 2005 Lydgalleriet has made projects in different locations in Bergen. During the first years the main base was Østre Skostredet 3, moving to USF Verftet for the renovation in 2011-2012 and then back to the renovated spaces in Østre Skostredet 3 in October 2012. Lydgalleriet moved to Strandgaten 195 in August 2020.

Lydgalleriet is funded by the Arts Council Norway and the city of Bergen with annual grants and has shown about 8 exhibitions each year since 2007. Lydgalleriet is the only permanent venue in Scandinavia that focuses on sound art, which is a growing field in the visual arts.

Lydgalleriet is a partner in the Norwegian production network for electronic art, PNEK, and the European sound art network Resonance.
