= Gesundheit Radio =

Art project exhibited in MOMA

The Gesundheit Radio is a 2010 artwork by James Chambers consisting of a transistor radio which periodically "sneezes" dust from its speaker grille. It was part of a series of "Artificial Defence Mechanisms" works imagining how electronic objects might display animal behaviors. Chambers suggest that this feature is at odds with the built-in obsolescence of many modern gadgets. The radio was exhibited at the Royal College of Art while Chambers was studying there, and at MOMA in 2011.

The exclamation "Gesundheit!" (meaning "Health!") is the German response to someone who has sneezed.

The ficional back-story of the piece, that it had been designed in the 1970s by Texas Instruments to reduce dust build-up, was reported in the press without clear indication that this story was fictional and the work was an art exhibit.

== Fictional backstory ==
According to Chambers' fictional backstory for the device, it was supposedly created by an experimental research group at Texas Instruments in 1972. It had been engineered to sneeze routinely once every six months, blowing out dust and shaking its case, supposedly to protect its early microprocessors from dust and ensure a longer life for the device.

Chambers attributed the design to the "Attenborough Design Group", supposed to have been active in the 1970s and 1980s, and an experimental section within Texas Instruments, where it was their first product. Other whimsical artworks with technological inspiration supposed to have been created by the group included the AntiTouch Lamp which avoided human touch, allegedly to protect its halogen lamp.

In the fictional history, the experimental research group within Texas Instruments was said to have examined how behaviors in nature could be applied to design; in this case, the ability to sneeze. It was said to be investigating the potential of other animal actions to be used as defense for a 'family' of between 3 and 5 products, and re-interpreting the standing hard drive (an earlier artwork) as a portable floppy disk drive so as to fit in with the Attenborough Design Group's fictional timeline. The whimsical device's legs popped up when coffee was spilt on the table under it, keeping it out of harm's way.

== Reception ==
Chris Davies, writing on SlashGear, commented that personal computers would benefit from a feature like the Gesundheit Radio's bellows to keep them free of dust, given by how much of it they habitually collect.

Jaymi Heimbuch, writing on TreeHugger, wrote that keeping dust out of gadgets prolonged their lives, and that while engineering an iPad to sneeze like the Gesundheit Radio might not be a good idea, cleaning electronics devices certainly is.
