= Borealis (festival) =

Norwegian festival for experimental music

Borealis is an annually recurring Norwegian contemporary music festival located in Bergen since 2006.

The festival is a continuation of the earlier festivals Music Factory and Autunnale.

A large number of cultural institutions in Bergen are backing the festival, and Hild Borchrevink is the festival's chair leader.
