= Preachers' Daughters =

- Genre: Docusoap
- Country of origin: United States
- Original language: English
- No. of seasons: 3
- No. of episodes: 31

Production
- Executive producers: Adam Freeman; Adam Reed; Aaron Fishman; Adam Freeman; Emily Sinclair; Leslie Greif; Eli Lehrer; Mary Donahue; Kimberly Chessler
- Running time: 41 to 43 minutes
- Production company: Thinkfactory Media

Original release
- Network: Lifetime
- Release: March 12, 2013 – April 3, 2015

Preachers' Daughters is an American docusoap series that premiered on March 12, 2013, and airs on Lifetime. The second season premiered on March 5, 2014, with two families joining the cast. The third season was announced to be returning on January 23, 2015, with two new families. The Colemans, the Elliots, and the Koloffs were not returning to the third season with it turning into a reality TV show with 9 girls who are living in the house and trying to stay saved and without leaving.

== Premise ==
Preachers' Daughters encompasses four to five pastors' daughters and their families as they are put through the test of balancing their lives with their parents' firm expectations, all the while following their religious values.

== Cast ==
=== Current ===
- Megan Cassidy (Hometown: Inman, South Carolina, age: 18) - the only returning member of season-two's cast
- Tyche Crockett (Hometown: New Orleans, Louisiana, age: 22)
- Nikki Efimetz (Hometown: Columbia, South Carolina, age: 19)
- Kristiana Flowers (Hometown: Detroit, Michigan, age: 18)
- Jayde Gomez (Hometown: Lakeland, Florida), age: 20)
- Kori Haynes (Hometown: McComb, Mississippi, age: 22)
- Cierra Vaughn (Hometown: Country Club Hills, Illinois, age: 23)
- Kayla Wilde (Hometown: Newport Beach, California, age: 20)
- Lolly White (Hometown: Inglewood, California, age: 24)

=== Former ===
- The Perrys (location: Oceano, California) - Olivia is 18 years old and has her own child. After living a life of using drugs and underage drinking, Olivia was able to turn her life around in time for her daughter's birth. Her stronger religious connection and family has helped her along the way. Olivia's father, Mark, is the pastor of Everyday Church, where her mother, Cheryl, both works at the church part-time and stays at home helping the family. Olivia has two older sisters: Emily (age 20) and Audrey (age 23).
- The Colemans (location: Joliet, Illinois) - Taylor is 18 years old. Her mother, Marie, attempts to keep a peaceful household despite Taylor wanting to break all the rules. Ken, Taylor's father, is a pastor of the City of Refuge Pentecostal Church. Taylor vents about life to her older sister Kendra, who was kicked out at the age of 20 because she became pregnant.
- The Koloffs (location: Kannapolis, North Carolina and Spring Hill, Tennessee) - Kolby is 16 years old. Her parents are divorced, so her time is divided between two homes. Her father, Nikita, is a former professional wrestler, but is now a traveling evangelist. Her mother and ex-wife of Nikita, Victoria, is a Christian preacher who also hosts a radio show and is a director of two pregnancy centers. Kolby is the youngest in the family, with three older sisters: Kendra, Tawni, and Teryn. In the first few episodes of season one, Kolby had a boyfriend named Micah.
- The Elliotts (location:New Orleans, Louisiana) - Tori is a former cop, and her parents are Kenny and Monique. After she was served with an eviction notice, Tori is forced to move back home with her parents and sister, Courtney.
- The Cassidys (location: Boiling Springs, South Carolina) - Megan's father, Jeff, joined the ministry full-time and discovered that everything she does or says is seen by the entire church. Her mother, Darleen, is the associate pastor's wife, while Megan's brother, Zac, is in rehabilitation.

== Episodes ==
Season	Episodes	Originally released	
Season	Episodes	First released	Last released
1	10	March 12, 2013	May 14, 2013
2	10	March 5, 2014	May 7, 2014
3	11	January 23, 2015	April 3, 2015

=== Season 1 (2013) ===
No. overall	No. in season	Title	Original release date	U.S. viewers (millions)
1	1	"Daddy's Little Angels"	March 12, 2013	1.51
Kolby prepares to ask her parents if she can start dating. Olivia is unsure of who her baby's father truly is.
2	2	"Lead Us Not Into Temptation"	March 19, 2013	1.74
Olivia receives the results of her paternity test. Taylor hides the truth from her parents and goes with her friends to a party. Kolby is shocked after her sister reveals a confession.
3	3	"Tempted by the Fruit of Another"	March 26, 2013	1.18
Taylor finds a potential future boyfriend. Olivia sits down with her lawyer after notifying the baby's father.
4	4	"Turning Water to Wine"	April 2, 2013	1.15
Olivia introduces a boy from her past to her parents. Nikita asks his daughters to assist him in rekindling his relationship with their mother. Taylor attends a double date with her parents.
5	5	"Dancing With the Devil"	April 9, 2013	1.25
Kolby reevaluates her relationship with Micah. Taylor is distraught after her father falls victim to a health scare. Olivia learns some hidden secrets about Frankie.
6	6	"Saints vs. Sinners"	April 16, 2013	1.12
Taylor and her mother work to keep the church running smoothly while Taylor's father is in the hospital. Olivia would like to take her daughter trick-or-treating on Halloween, but her parents disagree. Kolby hosts a house party for Halloween.
7	7	"Naughty and Nice"	April 23, 2013	1.08
Kolby and her sisters have a girls weekend out and things get a bit unholy. Taylor is forced to attend a purity class. Olivia flies to Los Angeles in order to visit her sister and take part in a photo shoot.
8	8	"When the Cat's Away, the Mice Will Play"	April 30, 2013	0.93
Olivia is asked to lead an outing for troubled teens. Kolby's mother reveals a secret from her past. Taylor and her sister Kendra visit a Christian college.
9	9	"Hallelujah"	May 7, 2013	0.74
Kolby's mother gives her permission to date. Taylor celebrates her eighteenth birthday. Olivia worries that her past could come back to haunt her daughter.
10	10	"Behind the Pulpit: Preachers' Daughters Clip Show"	May 14, 2013	0.67
The Perrys, Colemans and Koloffs recall highlights from the first season.

=== Season 2 (2014) ===
No. overall	No. in season	Title	Original release date	U.S. viewers (millions)
11	1	"Raising Hell"	March 5, 2014	0.92
Kolby informs her parents of where she wants her life to go. Megan disobeys her parents by sneaking out to attend a party. Tori receives an eviction notice. Taylor is a part of a music video shoot and later views it with her family.
12	2	"Holier Than Thou"	March 12, 2014	0.89
Taylor tries to find a Christian boy to date. Kolby's father does not agree with her dream. Megan is questioned after a tweet is seen by her family. Tori goes to a pool party.
13	3	"Father, Forgive Me"	March 19, 2014	0.93
Tori and Courtney claim to be playing tennis, but it is really a date. Taylor winds up with two prom dates. Kolby goes to church with her mother and her sister Teryn's daughter.
14	4	"Papa Don't Preach"	March 26, 2014	1.39
Megan's parents want her to take a drug test. Taylor's love life takes a turn for the worse. Tori's parents tell her she has to leave. Teryn does not support Kolby's church event.
15	5	"Long Way Home"	April 2, 2014	1.14
Tori chooses not to attend her job interview. Taylor goes to a zombie movie audition. Kolby's mother, Victoria, discusses premarital sex with the girls. Megan's family prepares for Zac to return home from rehab.
16	6	"Damned If You Do..."	April 9, 2014	1.09
Kolby's sister, Teryn, feels that her marriage is on the rocks. Megan receives a scolding from fellow church members. Tori wants to prove herself to her parents. Taylor cuts class.
17	7	"Breaking Bad Girls"	April 16, 2014	1.21
Despite her parents warning her not to go on dates, Megan chooses to go anyway. The Elliott family goes on a swap tour to bond. Taylor is stunned when she is informed about her father's condition.
18	8	"Caught in the Act"	April 23, 2014	1.11
Taylor raises money for her father by having a bikini car wash. Kolby goes on a trip without notifying her parents. Tori's friends turn against her.
19	9	"Hallowed Be My Name"	April 30, 2014	1.58
The Koloff girls plan Teryn's bachelorette party. Taylor might lose both of her parents. Tori is confronted by her parents. Megan ends up going on a camping trip with boys.
20	10	"Good Girl, Bad Girl"	May 7, 2014	0.81
The Cassidy's attend Christian therapy. Teryn renews her vows with Chad. Taylor faces temptation while attending a party.

=== Season 3 (2015) ===
No. overall	No. in season	Title	Original release date	U.S. viewers (millions)
21	1	"Mission from God"	January 23, 2015	1.00
22	2	"Hot As Hell"	January 30, 2015	0.81
23	3	"Jesus Went to the Club"	February 6, 2015	0.99
24	4	"Turnt Up Game"	February 13, 2015	0.79
25	5	"Evil Eye For An Eye"	February 20, 2015	0.94
26	6	"A House Divided"	February 27, 2015	0.87
27	7	"Exodus"	March 6, 2015	0.88
28	8	"The Devil in the Details"	March 13, 2015	0.83
29	9	"The Preachers' Daughter That Cried Wolf"	March 20, 2015	0.82
30	10	"Hell Hath No Fury Like a Preachers' Daughter"	March 27, 2015	N/A
31	11	"Judgment Day"	April 3, 2015	N/A
