= Preachers Son =

- Origin: Dublin, Ireland
- Years active: 2010-present
- Members: Brian Hogan; Mark Walsh; Geoff French
- Past members: Various Artists
- Website: www.preachersson.com

Preachers Son is an Irish musical group based in Dublin. The group is led by Irish musician Brian Hogan, and as of 2014 includes guitarist Mark Walsh and drummer Geoff French. Past collaborations include various notable musicians such as Gavin Friday, Liam Ó Maonlaí, Cait O'Riordan, and Kenny Wollesen.

== History ==
Preachers Son was formed in 2010 by Brian Hogan, the son of a preacher. He grew up listening to groups like Black Sabbath, Jimi Hendrix, Led Zeppelin, and Neil Young. Hogan began playing bass at the age of 12 and traveled throughout Europe playing in his father's Christian band. He went on to play with various notable musicians, including Kíla who he still plays bass with. With Kila, Hogan shared a number-one-hit alongside U2 and The Dubliners (The Ballad of Ronnie Drew) and in 2010 an Oscar nomination for animated feature The Secret of Kells.

Preachers Son's debut album was released independently in 2010. Titled Love Life and Limb, the album was mixed by Dave Bascombe in the Metropolis studios in London and includes a duet with Gavin Friday on the song Lipstick. The band has toured in Ireland as well as internationally in Europe, the United Kingdom, Canada and the United States. In 2012, Preachers Son won the best music video at the Los Angeles Film and Script Festival for the song Come On, as well as being screened at the London International Film Festival.

Preachers Son's latest release came in August 2014 with the studio album 10 Stories Tall recorded in Los Angeles, finished and produced by Warren Huart with earlier production work on several tracks by Marc Urselli.

=== Notable collaborators ===
Preacher's Son has collaborated with many musical artists since their inception, including Kenny Wollesen and Gavin Friday.

- Aisling O'Connell
- Arunas Lukasevicius
- Dan Cassoni
- Dave Keegan
- Ellen O'Reilly
- Frailan Moran Mendive
- Jay Boland
- Joe Leech
- Kenny Wollesen
- Laoighse Styles
- Mary Barnecutt
- Michael Angelo Batio
- Nicky Brennan
- Rori Coleman
- Shane Fitzsimons
- Sven Dupon
- Tony Oscar
- Aisling Connoly
- Cait O'Riordan
- Dara Munnis
- Davy Blythe
- Emmaline Duffy-Fallon
- Gavin Friday
- Joanne McVeigh
- Jonny Field
- Kathrine Barnecutt
- Liam Ó Maonlaí
- Mark Walsh
- Michael Cronin
- Phil Allen
- Roz McVeigh
- Simon Wall
- Tabby Callaghan
- Warren Huart
- Anthony McMahon
- Ciaran Crilly
- Darren Sweeney
- Dean McTaggart
- Eoin Fitzsimons
- Gavin Ralston
- Geoff French
- Jose Carlos Anselmo Flores
- Kieran Kennedy
- Mark Ellison
- Mark Urselli
- Michael Cheatham
- Richie Buckley
- Sean Millar
- Ste O'Neill
- Tanya O'Callaghan

== Discography ==
=== Studio albums ===
- 2014, 10 Stories Tall
- 2011, Love Life & Limb (re-release)
- 2010, Love Life & Limb

=== Extended plays ===
- 2013, Jericho

=== Singles ===
- 2014, Jericho
- 2012, Come On
- 2011, This Time Of Life
- 2010, X For Sandra
