= Kolby Koloff =

American singer-songwriter (born 1996)

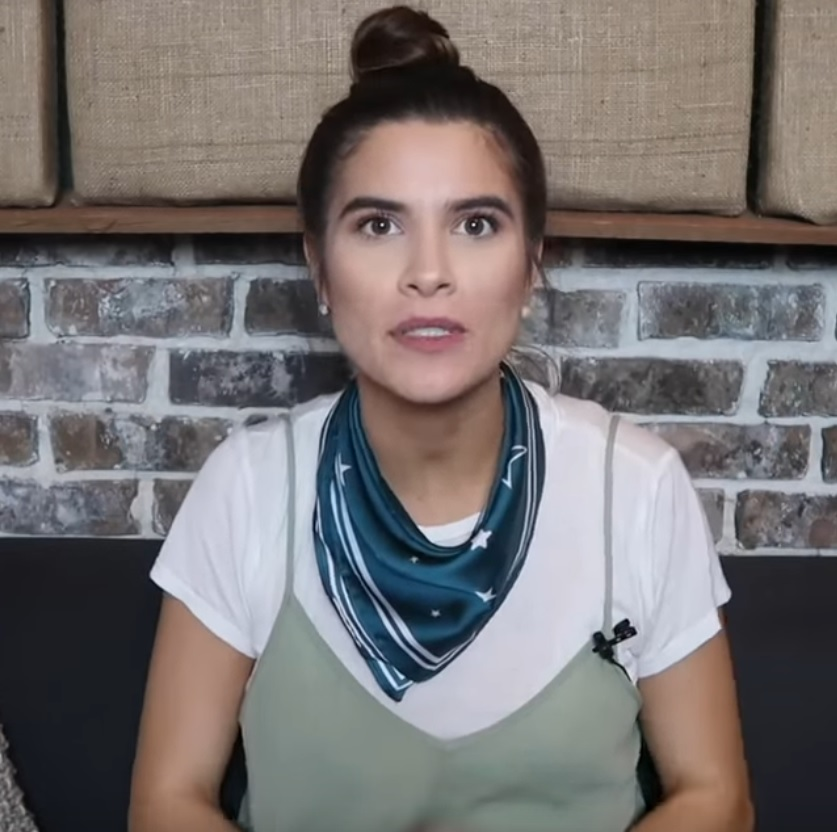

Background information
- Born: Kolby Alexandra Koloff; May 14, 1996 (age 29); Kannapolis, North Carolina, U.S.
- Origin: Spring Hill, Tennessee, U.S.
- Genres: Worship, Christian pop
- Occupations: Singer, songwriter
- Instrument: vocals
- Years active: 2015–present
- Label: Maxx

Kolby Alexandra Koloff (born May 14, 1996) is an American Christian music singer-songwriter, who primarily plays a Christian pop style of worship music. Her first extended play, Grow, was released by Maxx Recordings in 2015 where its single, "Grow", was her entrant Billboard magazine song.

== Early life ==
Koloff was born Kolby Alexandra Koloff, on May 14, 1996, in Kannapolis, North Carolina, the youngest daughter of Nikita Koloff and his second wife Victoria. She used to be an actress on Preachers' Daughters, before starting her singing and songwriting career.

== Music career ==
Koloff's music recording career commenced in 2015, with her first extended play, Grow, that was released on October 2, 2015, by Maxx Recordings. The single, "Grow", was her debut entrant on the Billboard magazine Christian Airplay chart, where it peaked at No. 34.

Kolby presented at the 5th Annual We Love Christian Music Awards which was broadcast on JUCE TV.

== Discography ==
=== Extended plays ===
List of EPs, with selected chart positions
Title	Details
Grow	Release date: October 2, 2015; Label: Maxx Recordings; Format: Digital download

=== Singles ===
List of singles, with selected chart positions, showing year released and album name
Year	Title	Peak positions	Album
Year	Title	US Christian Airplay	Album
2015	"Grow"	34	Grow
2016	"No Room"	33	Non-album single
"—" denotes a recording that did not chart or was not released in that territory.
