= Ter (title) =

Armenian honorific

Ter (Eastern Armenian) or Der (Western Armenian) (lit. 'lord'), is a hereditary honorific prefixed to family names of descendants of married clergy in the Armenian Apostolic Church. The first president of the modern Armenia, Levon Ter-Petrosyan is a notable example. Both male and female descendants are entitled to the honorific which can be used only before the surname and not the Christian (first) names, since use of Ter or Der before the Christian name would denote a member of the clergy and is equivalent to "Reverend" or "Father" in English usage.
