= Gerda =

- Gender: Female

Origin
- Origin: Scandinavia
- Meaning: Spear

Other names
- Nickname: Gerd
- Related names: Gerde, Gerdura, Gert, Gerti

Gerda is a feminine given name. It may refer to:

- Gerda Ahlm (1869–1956), Swedish-born American painter and art conservator
- Gerda Alexander (1908–1994), Danish teacher and therapist
- Gerda Antti (1929–2026), Swedish writer
- Gerda Becker, Dutch table tennis player
- Gerda Bengtsson (1900–1995), Danish textile artist
- Gerda Blees (born 1985), Dutch writer
- Gerda Blumenthal (1923–2004), German-American literary scholar
- Gerda Boyesen (1922–2005), Norwegian psychotherapist
- Gerda Bredgaard (1908–1996), Danish swimmer
- Gerda Bryłka (born 1941), Polish gymnast
- Gerda Bülow (1904–1990), Danish violinist
- Gerda Charles, pseudonym of the British novelist Edna Lipson (1915–1996)
- Gerda Christian (1913–1997), German private secretary of Adolf Hitler
- Gerda Christophersen (1870–1947), Danish actress
- Gerda Claeskens (fl. 2000s), Belgian statistician
- Gerda Daumerlang (1920–2006), German diver
- Gerda Dendooven (born 1962), Belgian illustrator
- Gerda Fiil (1927–1994), Danish resistance fighter
- Gerda Frömel (1931–1975), Czechoslovak-born Austrian sculptor
- Gerda Gantz (born 1915, date of death unknown), Romanian fencer
- Gerda Gattel (1908–1993), American comic book author
- Gerda Geertens (born 1955), Dutch composer
- Gerda Gilboe (1914–2009), Danish actress and singer
- Gerda Grepp (1907–1940), Norwegian writer and socialist
- Gerda Hasselfeldt (born 1950), Bavarian politician
- Gerda Hellberg (1870–1937), Swedish women's rights activist
- Gerda Henning (1891–1951), Danish textile designer
- Gerda Herrmann (1931–2021), German composer and poet
- Gerda Hnatyshyn (born 1935), Canadian viceregal consort
- Gerda Hofstätter (born 1971), Austrian billiards player
- Gerda Höglund (1878–1973), Swedish painter
- Gerda Höjer (1893–1974), Swedish nurse, recipient of the Florence Nightingale Medal and President of the International Council of Nurses
- Gerda Holmes (1891–1943), Danish actress
- Gerda Johansson (1891–1965), Swedish diver
- Gerda Johner (born 1944), Swiss figure skater
- Gerda-Maria Jürgens (1917–1998), German actress
- Gerda van der Kade-Koudijs (1923–2015), Dutch sprinter and hurdler
- Gerda Karstens (1903–1988), Danish ballet dancer
- Gerda Kieninger (1951–2020), German politician
- Gerda Kordemets (born 1960), Estonian theatre and film director, screenwriter, theatre critic, and journalist
- Gerda Kraan (born 1933), Dutch middle-distance runner
- Gerda Krüger-Nieland (1910–2000), German lawyer and senate president
- Gerda Krūmiņa (born 1984), Latvian biathlete
- Gerda Kupferschmied (born 1942), German athlete
- Gerda Lammers (1915–1993), German soprano
- Gerda Laski (1893–1928), Austrian/German physicist
- Gerda Lassooij (born 1952), Dutch swimmer
- Gerda Lerner (1920–2013), Austrian-born American historian and author
- Gerda Lundequist (1871–1959), Swedish stage actress
- Gerda Madsen (1902–1986), Danish film actress
- Gerda Marcus (1880–1952), Swedish journalist and philanthropist
- Gerda Martín (born 1927), Chilean athlete (javelin)
- Gerda Maurus (1903–1968), Austrian actress
- Gerda Mayer (1927–2021), Czechoslovak-born English poet
- Gerda Müller (1894–1951), German actress
- Gerda Munsinger (1929–1998), East German prostitute and alleged Soviet spy
- Gerda Nettesheim (1947–2011), German sound artist
- Gerda Neumann (1915–1947), Danish film actress
- Gerda Nicolson (1937–1992), Australian actress
- Gerda Olsen (born 1932), Danish swimmer
- Gerda Palm (1871–1949), Swedish painter
- Gerda Pak (born 1993), Estonian swimmer
- Gerda Paumgarten (1907–2000), Austrian alpine skier
- Gerda Planting-Gyllenbåga (1878–1950), Swedish suffragist and social welfare expert
- Gerda Philipsborn (1895–1943), German educator and social reformer
- Gerda Ranz (born 1944), German runner
- Gerda Rieser-Cegnar (fl. 1960s), Austrian luger
- Gerda Ring (1891–1999), Norwegian-born stage actress and producer
- Gerda Roosval-Kallstenius (1864–1939), Swedish painter
- Gerda Roux (born 1973), South African archer
- Gerda Rubinstein (1931–2022), Dutch composer
- Gerda Schriever (1928–2014), German contalto
- Gerda Schmidt-Panknin (1920–2021), German painter
- Gerda Sierens (born 1961), Belgian racing cyclist
- Gerda Sprinchorn (1871–1951), Swedish sculptor and ceramist
- Gerda Staniek (1925–1985), Austrian athlete (javelin)
- Gerda Steinhoff (1922–1946), Polish Nazi SS concentration camp overseer, hanged for war crimes
- Gerda Stevenson (born 1956), Scottish actress, director and writer
- Gerda Steyn (born 1990), South African marathon athlete
- Gerda Sutton (1923–2005), British-French painter
- Gerda Taro (1910–1937), German war photographer
- Gerda Maria Terno (1909–1995), German actress
- Gerda Tirén (1858–1928), Swedish artist
- Gerda Uhlemann (born 1945), German athlete
- Gerda Verburg (born 1957), Dutch diplomat, politician and trade union leader
- Gerda Voitechovskaja (born 1991), Lithuanian badminton player
- Gerda de Vries (fl. 2000s), Canadian mathematician
- Gerda Wallander (1860–1926), Swedish painter
- Gerda Wegener (1886–1940), Danish fine-artist, illustrator and painter
- Gerda Weissensteiner (born 1969), Italian luger and bobsleigh pilot
- Gerda Weissmann Klein (1924–2022), Polish-born American writer and human rights activist
- Gerda Weltz (born 1951), Danish darts player
- Gerda Wrede (1896–1967), Finnish actor and speech therapist
- Gerda von Zobeltitz (1891–1963), early German transgender woman and dressmaker

== Fictional characters ==
- Gerda, a character of Hans Christian Andersen's The Snow Queen and its adaptations
- Gerda, a character on the children's television show Sesamstraat
- Gerda Christow, a character in Agatha Christie's novel The Hollow
- Gerda Gustav, a character in the children's TV series Hilda

== Entertainment ==
- Gerda (film), a 2021 Russian film
- Gerda: A Flame in Winter, a 2022 video game
