= List of sound artists =

This is a list of sound artists. Sound art is a diverse group of art practices that considers wide notions of sound, listening and hearing as its predominant focus. There is contention as to which artists are “sound artists” or if another category might be more accurate such as experimental music, electronic music, sound installation, circuit bending, sound sculpture, builder of experimental musical instruments, noise music, acoustic ecology, sound poetry, installation art, performance art or Fluxus.

- Frédéric Acquaviva
- AGF
- Alejandra and Aeron
- Miguel Álvarez-Fernández
- Maryanne Amacher
- Charles Amirkhanian
- Tarek Atoui
- Christine Sun Kim
- Laurie Anderson
- Magali Babin
- Adam Basanta
- William Basinski
- Pierre Bastien
- Harry Bertoia
- Jaap Blonk
- Baschet Brothers
- Brymo
- MW Burns
- Ken Butler
- Janet Cardiff
- Lawrence Chandler
- Richard Chartier
- Maria Chavez
- Phil Coy
- Walton Creel
- Alvin Curran
- Lance Dann
- G/MZ
- Tacita Dean
- Shawn Decker (sound artist)
- Poulomi Desai
- Chantal Dumas
- Judy Dunaway
- Kyle Bobby Dunn
- Max Eastley
- eRikm
- Christian Fennesz
- Bill Fontana
- Giovanni Fontana
- Terry Fox
- Bernhard Gal
- Reed Ghazala
- Kraig Grady
- Ken Gregory
- Lawrence Abu Hamdan
- Steve Heimbecker
- Brian House
- Brenda Hutchinson
- Ryoji Ikeda
- Michelle Jaffé
- Christopher Janney
- GX Jupitter-Larsen
- Timo Kahlen
- Jacob Kirkegaard
- David Kristian
- Georg Klein
- Viacheslav Koleichuk
- Christina Kubisch
- Petri Kuljuntausta
- Roland Kuit
- Yuri Landman
- Georges Lentz
- Augustine Leudar
- Arto Lindsay
- Annea Lockwood
- Francisco López
- Alvin Lucier
- Christian Marclay
- Miya Masaoka
- Ragnhild May
- Stephan Mathieu
- Abinadi Meza
- Christof Migone
- George Bures Miller
- Haroon Mirza
- Moondog
- Gordon Monahan
- David Monacchi
- Meredith Monk
- Tracie Morris
- Charlotte Moorman
- Bruce Nauman
- Max Neuhaus
- Angel Nevarez & Valerie Tevere
- Carsten Nicolai
- Margaret Noble
- Mendi & Keith Obadike
- Pauline Oliveros
- Yoko Ono
- Koka Nikoladze
- Nam June Paik’s early work pre-1970 and with Charlotte Moorman
- Charlemagne Palestine
- Paul Panhuysen
- Steve Parker
- Emily Peasgood
- Tristan Perich
- Norbert Walter Peters
- Liz Phillips
- Susan Philipsz
- Hans Reichel
- Jacques Rémus
- Boyd Rice
- Pipilotti Rist
- Manuel Rocha Iturbide
- Paul Rooney
- Rik Rue
- Janek Schaefer
- Stan Shaff
- Severed Heads
- Don Simmons
- Elliott Sharp
- George Smits
- Michael Snow
- Soundlab
- Rod Summers
- Takis
- Jeff Talman
- Robert Scott Thompson
- Gerda Nettesheim
- Jean Tinguely
- Yasunao Tone
- Trimpin
- Thomas Truax
- Edwin van der Heide
- David Van Tieghem
- Hanna Tuulikki
- Stephen Vitiello
- Carl Michael von Hausswolff
- Bill Viola
- Wolf Vostell
- Yoshi Wada
- Jennifer Walshe
- Hildegard Westerkamp
- Daniel Wilson
- Mark Peter Wright
- John Wynne
- LaMonte Young
- Samson Young
- Pavel Zhagun
- Z'EV
- Zimoun
- Pierre Redon
