= Mia Leche Löfgren =

Swedish author and peace activist (1878–1966)

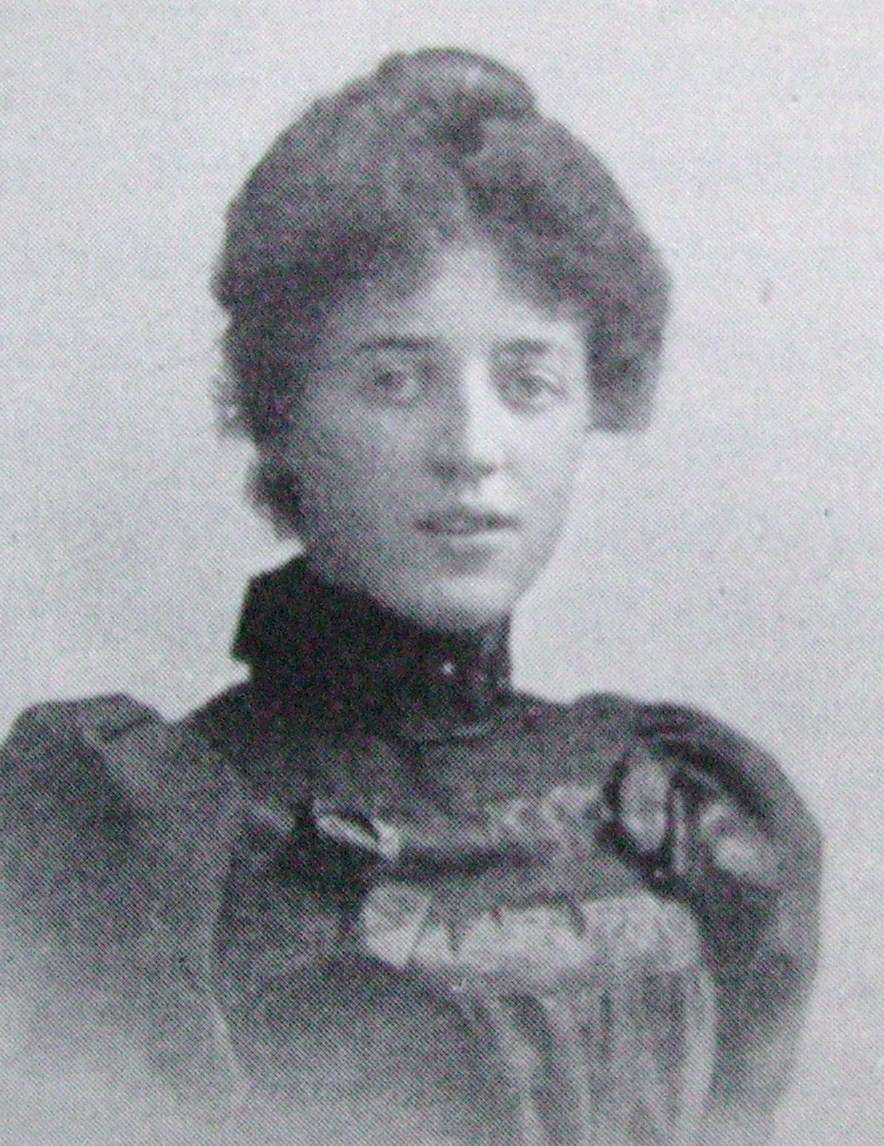
- Born: Ebba Maria Lovisa Leche; 10 October 1878; Lund, Sweden
- Died: 8 April 1966 (aged 87); Stockholm, Sweden
- Occupations: Journalist, writer, peace activist
- Children: 3

Ebba Maria Lovisa "Mia" Leche Löfgren (10 October 1878 – 8 April 1966) was a Swedish journalist, writer and peace activist, known for her strong stance against National Socialism and anti-Semitism as well as her involvement in refugee aid and humanitarian relief.

== Biography ==
=== Family and personal life ===
Mia Leche Löfgren was born on 10 October 1878, in Lund. The daughter of Jakob Wilhelm Ebbe Gustaf Leche (4 September 1850 in Helsingborg – 29 January 1927 in Stockholm) and Wilhelmina (Minchen) Dorothea Fredrika Louisa Sager (16 July 1855 in Lintrup, Denmark – 28 April 1947 in Stockholm), she grew up in a bourgeois family with close contacts to local academic and intellectual circles. When her father, a zoologist, was appointed principal of Stockholm University College (Stockholm högskola) the family moved to the Swedish capital. In 1884, he was promoted to professor of zoology. The family's social networks were progressive and liberal, spanning academics as well as educators, cultural intellectuals and politicians, and leaving Leche Löfgren, her younger sister and several brothers many freedoms during their childhood. In the 1890s she was sent to attend Whitlockska skolan in Stockholm, a school with a reform pedagogical curriculum. She was taught, among others, by Ellen Key, who left a lasting impact on Leche Löfgren's feminist and political convictions and established her first contacts into the writing and publishing industry.

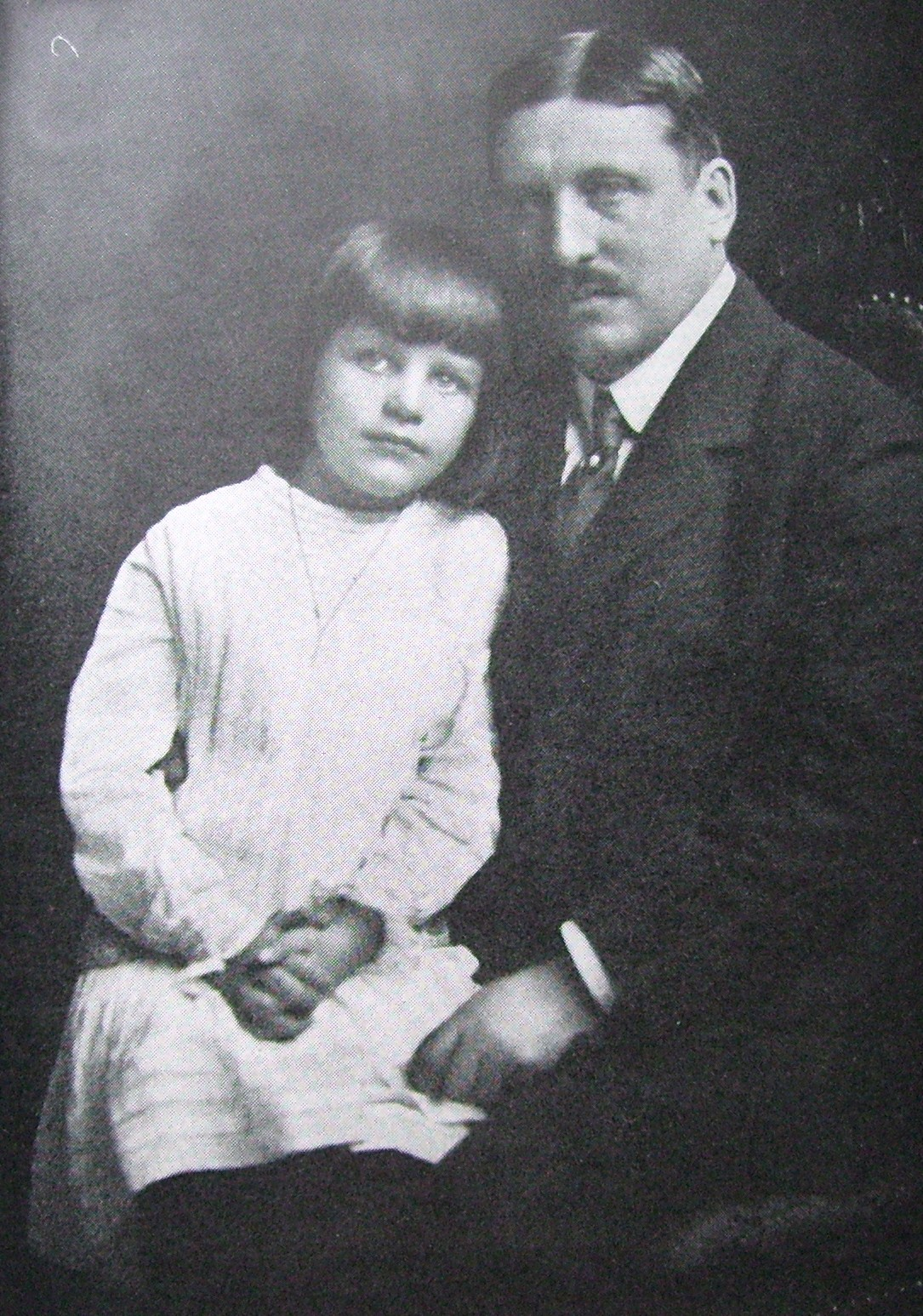
Mia Leche Löfgren's husband Eliel Löfgren and their daughter Ulla.

In the late 1890s, Leche Löfgren continued her education with various language and writing courses, although she did not obtain an official degree. She also attended lectures about working class issues and the position of women in society. On 6 October 1900, at age 22, she married Fredrik Hjalmar von Friesen (28 June 1873 in Forsmark – 31 January 1947). The couple had a son, Otto Bertil von Friesen (4 June 1901 in Stockholm – 13 February 1990 in Gothenburg), who later became a medical doctor, as well as a daughter, Anna Lisa von Friesen. Her later writings reveal that the marriage was not a happy one and in 1908 the couple filed for divorce. The separation process caused somewhat of a public scandal and in the end, Leche Löfgren lost custody of her children and was forbidden any direct contact with them. She would not see her older daughter Anna Lisa again as she died when still a child, but could re-establish contact with her son Otto Bertil after he reached his majority.

In summer 1909, Leche Löfgren married her second husband, the well-known lawyer, professor and later Minister of Justice and Foreign Minister Eliel Löfgren (15 March 1872 in Piteå – 8 April 1940 in Stockholm) with whom she had another daughter, named Ulla Amanda.

Having become involved in Swedish anti-Nazi activism, Leche Löfgren moved to Gothenburg in 1940 after the death of her husband to be closer to Torgny Segerstedt, editor-in-chief of the newspaper Göteborgs Handels- och Sjöfartstidning, with whom she collaborated in the effort to educate and alert the Swedish public about German Fascism and anti-Semitism. In the 1950s she moved back to Stockholm, where she continued to be an active figure in various organizations engaged in peace education, refugee aid and other humanitarian matters.

She died in Stockholm, on 8 April 1966, aged 87, and is buried at Norra begravningsplatsen in Solna, Stockholm.

=== Journalism and writing activities ===
Having occasionally worked as a translator for public and legal documents, Leche Löfgren made her first appearance as a writer in 1906 after attending a public speech by Ellen Key on the subject of peace and humanitarianism. On her way home, she became a witness to how a private failed to salute a passing lieutenant with due deference was "virtually lynched" for his negligence, as she later described the incident in her autobiographical work. Back at home she wrote an anti-militarist article that she sent anonymously to Illustreradt Hvad Nytt, apparently in error as this conservative newspaper did not really align with her political convictions. With her first article published, she then continued to send articles and comments to the literary and women's periodical Idun as well as the satirical magazines Kurre and Söndagsnisse.

From 1906 to 1908, she was employed by the conservative newspaper Vårt land as a writer of book reviews for literature that the journal's chief literary critic, Carl David af Wirsén, was not interested in, especially works written by and for women. Developing an easygoing and engaging writing style, her reviews and the occasional columns and reports were well-received, as Leche Löfgren further developed what Ellen Key had earlier called her "immense ease of shaping the Swedish language". In terms of content, her writings often engaged with the position of women in Swedish society as well as her musings on social and political developments and personal experiences of being a wife and mother. From 1916, she also began to write columns for Göteborgs Handels- och Sjöfarts-Tidning, whose editor-in-chief Torgny Segerstedt she already knew from previous work at the liberal periodical Forum in Stockholm.

Leche Löfgren had her literary debut in 1930 with a biography of Ellen Key. Drawing on Key's reformist ideas and pacifism as much as on her own appreciation of her former teacher, the book was well received by the Swedish public. In the following years she continued to publish a series of autobiographical books in a style that mixed literary prose with subjective social commentary, including her insights of political and societal developments as well as portraits of friends, family members, her husband Eliel Löfgren and her role as a woman, wife and mother: Våra föräldras värld (The World of Our Parents), 1934, Så var det då 1900–1940 (It Was Like This 1900–1940), 1941, Hård tid (Hard Times), 1946, Ideal och människor (Ideals and People), 1952, Upplevt (Experienced), 1958, and Bokslut (Closure), 1962. She also published biographical works on opera singer Kristina Nilsson and the German journalist and pacifist Carl von Ossietsky.

The 1930s and the rising threat of Nazism did not only have an impact on her political activism in the Swedish peace movement, but also brought her back to journalism. She increased her writing activities for Göteborgs Handels- och Sjöfarts-Tidning, taking on a decidedly anti-Nazist stance and quickly developing into one of the most prominent political voices of the paper. Leche Löfgren was furthermore active as a member of the editorial board of Fönstret (1931–1936), wrote for the Gothenburg-based paper Morgontidning (1933–1940) and became popular throughout the country as a columnist for Idun from 1937 onward.

Following the death of her husband in 1940, Leche Löfgren decided to move to Gothenburg to better work with Torgny Segerstedt on the issue of Nazism and the persecution of Jews, journalists and other critical voices in the German Reich. Her analyses of the international situation, as well as the dangers of Nazism and anti-Semitism in Sweden, earned her national fame that lasts to this day.

=== Involvement in peace activism, anti-Nazism and refugee relief ===
Leche Löfgren later described that she found her inspiration for humanitarian engagement in a speech held by Ellen Key in the auditorium of the Swedish Academy of Sciences one evening in 1906:

"In the wake of the union crisis [between Sweden and the newly independent Norway] Ellen Key raised her calm, wise voice in a warm-hearted call for peace. The speech she gave in the auditorium of the old Academy of Sciences was the first peace oration that I heard, and it left an indelible impression on me." "I unionskrisens vågsvall höjde Ellen Key sin lugna, kloka stämma i en varmhjärtad maning till fred. Det anförande hon höll i gamla vetenskapsakademins hörsal var det första fredstal jag hört, och det gjorde outplånligt intryck på mig."

She became a member of various women's groups that were engaged in the question of universal suffrage, peace work and humanitarianism, although it was pacifism that interested her the most:

“Like all liberal women of the day, I was an all-round feminist, but Ann-Margret Holmgren, Karolina Widerström, Gerda Hellberg, Lydia Wahlström, Anna Bugge-Wicksell, Gulli Petrini, Signe Bergman, and other pioneering suffragists were from a somewhat earlier generation. If I was part of that movement, it was primarily for the cause of pacifism." "Jag var naturligtvis i största allmänhet kvinnosakskvinna, som alla liberala kvinnor var på den tiden", men sådana rösträttspionjärer som Ann-Margret Holmgren, Karolina Widerström, Gerda Hellberg, Lydia Wahlström, Anna Bugge-Wicksell, Gulli Petrini och Signe Bergman tillhörde en något äldre generation än min. Om jag kunde sägas vara med i denna rörelse, var det egentligen för fredssakens skull."

In 1914, Leche Löfgren was one of the initiators of the women's association Frisinnade kvinnor (Liberal-Minded Women) and in 1915 she participated in the Women's Peace Congress in The Hague, Netherlands, that had been organized to protest against the continuation of the First World War. Together with other Swedish representatives like Elin Wägner, Emilia Fogelklou and Matilda Widegren as well as the international representatives she was active in the setup of the Women's International League for Peace and Freedom that was to become one of the main institutional frameworks for her political activism. This organization also had a Swedish section, for which Leche Löfgren was elected as chair from 1915 and later served as vice chair from 1946 to 1952. During her time in Gothenburg, from 1942 to 1950, she also took the position as chair in the local branch of the organization (Göteborgskretsen).

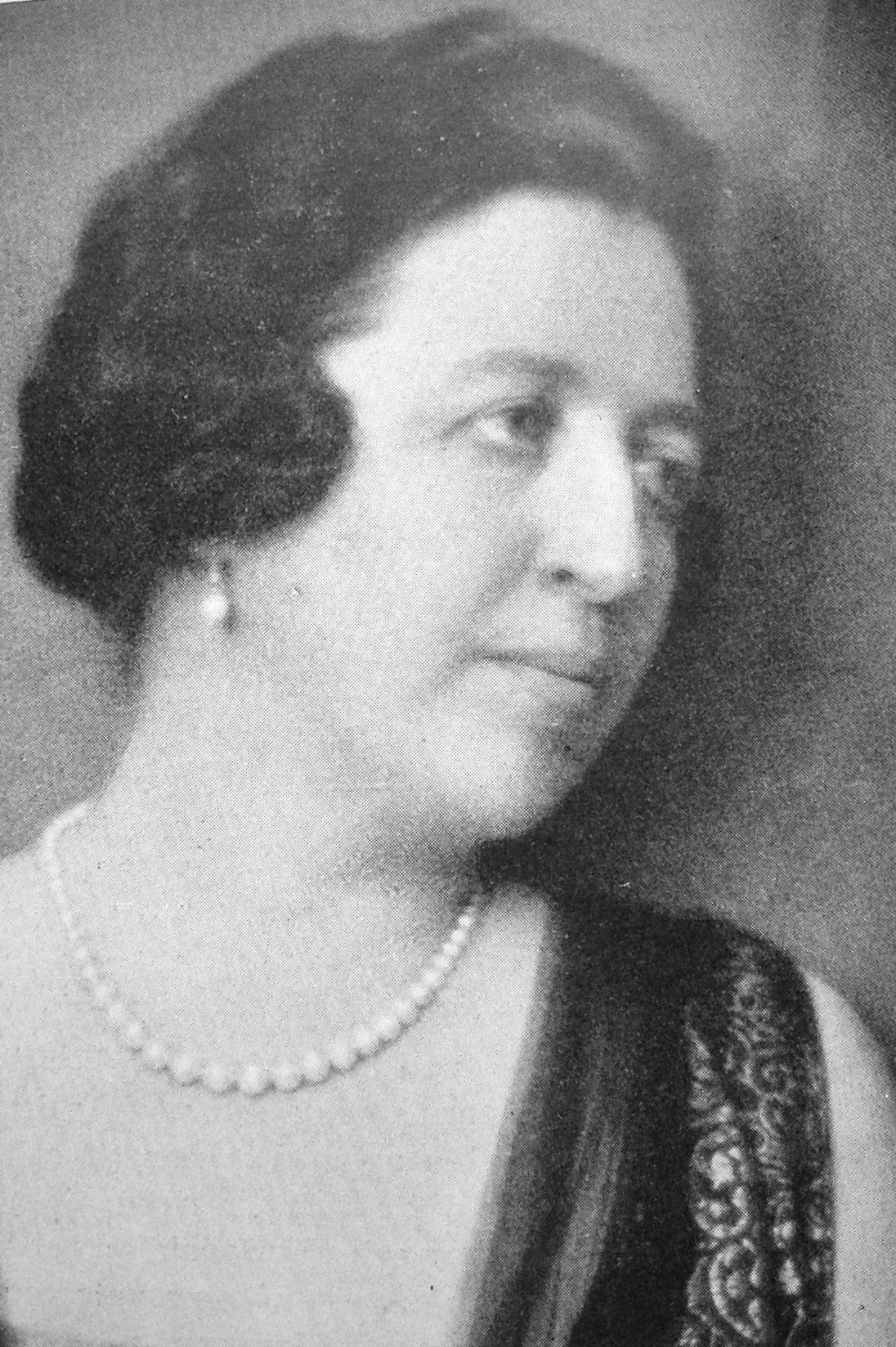
Mia Leche Löfgren. Author photo from her book Så var det då 1900–1940, Stockholm 1941.

In 1916, she furthermore participated in the establishment of the Aid Committee for Prisoners of War in Siberia (Hjälpkommiteen för krigsfångar i Sibirien), setting the stage for continuous involvement in relief work for refugees during both the First and Second World Wars, and reported on the work of the League of Nations. With the rise of Fascism across the European Continent she took a strong political stance for the protection of minorities, freedom of opinion and democratic values and was one of the first voices in Sweden to openly warn about collaboration with the German Reich for either economic or political benefit. In 1933, she supported setting up the Collection for Exiled Intellectuals (Insamlingen för landsflyktiga intellektuella), a humanitarian aid organization for the support of German refugees, mainly intellectuals, journalists and cultural artists seeking asylum in Sweden, for which she worked as vice president. However, the organization dissolved in 1940, amid an increasing influx of refugees from Germany as well as the occupied territories in Denmark, Norway, Poland and other countries, due to a lack of funding and problems in collecting sufficient donations from the general population. Next to her written condemnations of Nazism, political persecution and anti-Semitism, among them a number of articles in Jewish newspaper Judisk tidskrift, she frequently appeared as a public speaker. Reflecting on this time in her autobiographical work, Leche Löfgren described how the Swedish authorities attempted to hinder her work as they feared that it would further increase the attraction of Sweden as a secure harbour for refugees.

In her last work Bokslut (Closure), published in 1962, Leche Löfgren turned her attention to the other side of the political spectrum, warning that communist ideas might infiltrate the peace movement – in her opinion, the Swedish peace movement should remain strictly non-partisan and not align with any specific political party.

Leaving a rich legacy behind as one of the leading voices in Swedish peace activism during the first half of the 20th century, Leche Löfgren spent her last years in Stockholm until her death in 1966.

=== Awards ===
Leche Löfgren was awarded the Illis quorum by the Swedish government for her work.

== Bibliography (selection) ==
=== Autobiographical works ===
Leche Löfgren's autobiographical work, published in six books over almost 30 years, aspires to literary quality, encompassing both her personal life experiences, impressions of renowned contemporary personalities as well as musings and reactions to political and societal developments.

- Våra föräldrars värld. Stockholm: Lars Hökerbergs bokförlag, 1934.
- Så var det då: 1900–1940. Stockholm: Hökerberg, 1941.
- Hård tid. Stockholm: Hökerberg, 1946.
- Ideal och människor. Stockholm: Hökerberg, 1952.
- Upplevt. Stockholm: Hökerberg, 1959.
- Bokslut. Stockholm: Hökerberg, 1962.

=== Other works ===
- Röda korset. Stockholm: Sveriges folkskollärarinneförbund, 1924.
- Ett nytt försvar. Stockholm: Sv. Andelsförl., 1924. (together with Elin Wägner)
- Ellen Key. Hennes liv och verk. Stockholm: Natur och kultur, 1930.
- Carl von Ossietzky. Den siste tyske fredspristagaren. Stockholm: Internationella Kvinnoförbundet för Fred och Frihet, 1945.

=== Articles ===
- "Två svenska röster mot antijudisk propaganda". Judisk tidskrift. 1945(18). pp. 137–142. (ed. together with Jeanna Oterdahl)
- "Vår gemensamma skam". Judisk tidskrift. 1947(20). pp. 276–278.
- "Bernadottes minne och judarnas sak". Judisk tidskrift. 1948(21). pp. 290–291.
