= Ewa Doroszenko =

Polish artist

Ewa Doroszenko (born 1983) is a visual artist working in photography, painting and multimedia installations based in Warsaw, Poland. She received her Doctorate in Fine Arts from the Nicolaus Copernicus University in Torun, Poland. Doroszenko's main interest is in the intersection area between these practices.

Doroszenko combines various aspects of each medium in her art, drawing attention to the relations between humanity and its creations. A relationship between the man and technology, which is still being developed, offers a multitude of possible interpretations. She is fascinated by the artificial world of technology and its connection to the structure of nature.

Doroszenko explains:

"I create what I call 'visual situations' through both physical objects and digital pieces. My artistic research addresses questions of future technology in tune with digital aesthetics and traditional fine arts."

Ewa Doroszenko's projects were exhibited during art festivals, including Transmission Arts Festival Athens 2016, FILE 2015 Electronic Language International Festival in São Paulo, Biennale of Digital & Internet Art nfcdab in Wroclaw, ISEA – 21st International Symposium on Electronic Art in Vancouver, 9th IN OUT Festival in Gdansk, and GENERATE! Festival for Electronic Arts in Tübingen, among others. She has exhibited at Kasia Michalski Gallery in Warsaw, Centre of Contemporary Art in Torun, FAIT Gallery in Brno, The Starak Family Foundation and Gallery Propaganda in Warsaw. She also collaborated with her husband Jacek Doroszenko in an audio-visual art project called "Soundreaming".

== Collections ==
- Centre of Contemporary Art Znaki Czasu, Toruń, Poland
- Dolnośląskie Towarzystwo Zachęty Sztuk Pięknych, Wrocław, Poland
