= Nieland =

Nieland is a surname. Notable people with the name include:

- Hans Nieland (1900-1976), German politician
- Iris Nieland (born 1060), German politician
- Nick Nieland (born 1972), British javelin thrower
- Gerda Krüger-Nieland (1910-2000), German lawyer
