= Gothenburg Book Fair =

Annual book fair in Gothenburg, Sweden

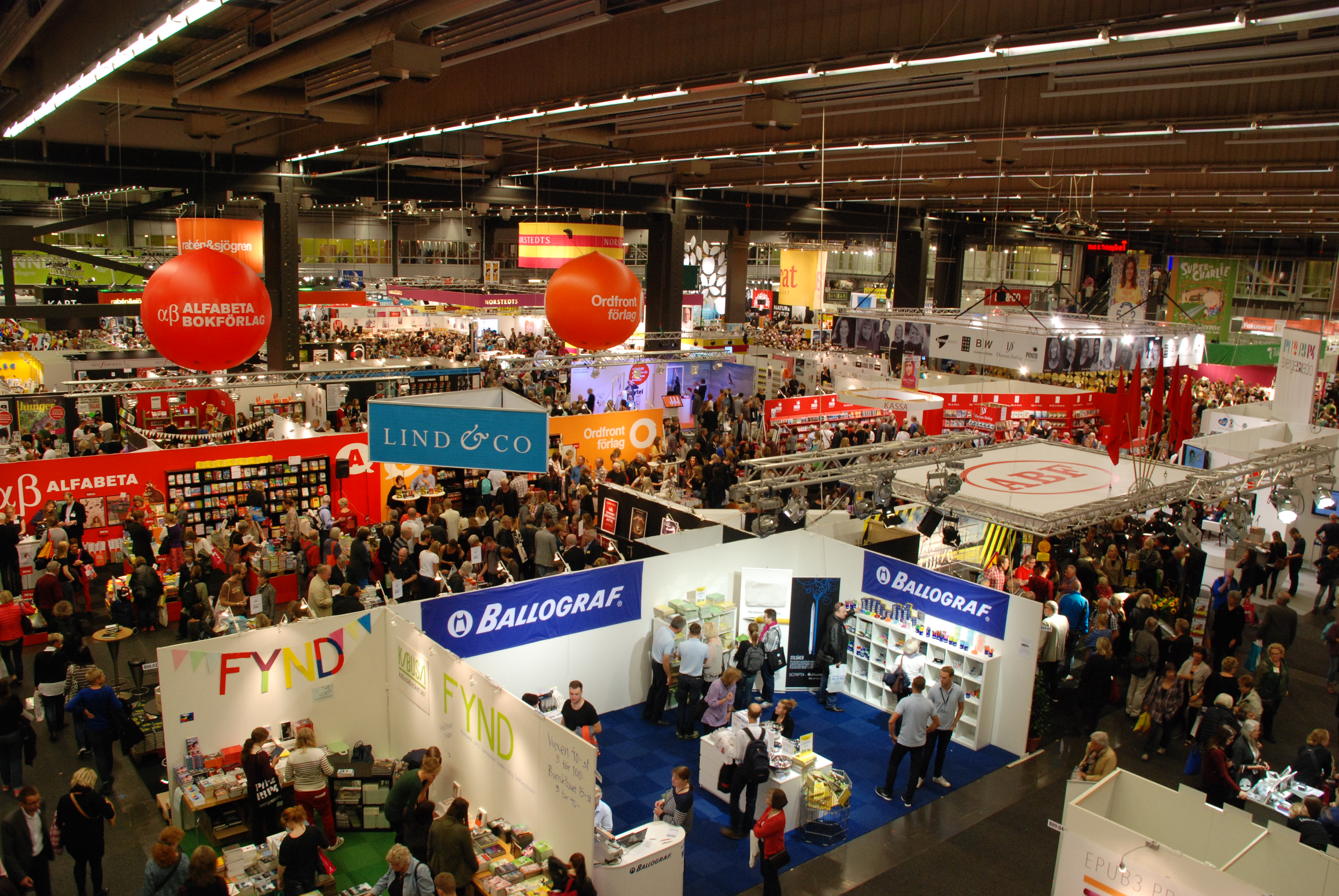
Gothenburg Book Fair

The Gothenburg Book Fair (also known as Göteborg Book Fair, Bok & Bibliotek, Bok- och biblioteksmässan or Bokmässan) is an annual event held in Gothenburg, Sweden, since 1985.

== Overview ==
The first Gothenburg Book Fair, then known as Bibliotek 85, began on 23 August 1985. There were about 5,000 visitors.

It started primarily as a trade fair (for librarians and teachers), but is now the largest literary festival in Scandinavia and the second largest book fair in Europe after the Frankfurt Book Fair. The book fair usually takes place in the last week of September each year. It has around 100,000 visitors and 900 exhibitors annually. It was reported in 2004 that the fair generated 170 million SEK of revenue for the city of Gothenburg.

In 2017, 127 authors signed a petition in Dagens Nyheter stating they would be boycotting the book fair due to the participation of far-right newspaper Nya Tider. The book fair received about 25% less visitors in 2017, which was attributed to the boycott and concerns about a Nordic Resistance Movement (NMR) march planned in close proximity. Several NMR members were later put on trial for trying to break through the barriers at the fair.

Due to the COVID-19 pandemic, the festival was held virtually in 2020.

There was controversy in 2025 after fair talks were advertised by the Sweden–Israel Friendship Association under the titles of "Den fabricerade svälten i Gaza" (English: The fabricated famine in Gaza) and "UNRWA – länken mellan terror och FN?" (English: UNRWA – the link between terrorism and the UN?). The titles were changed after criticism.
