= Annelie Enochson =

Swedish politician and architect (born 1953)

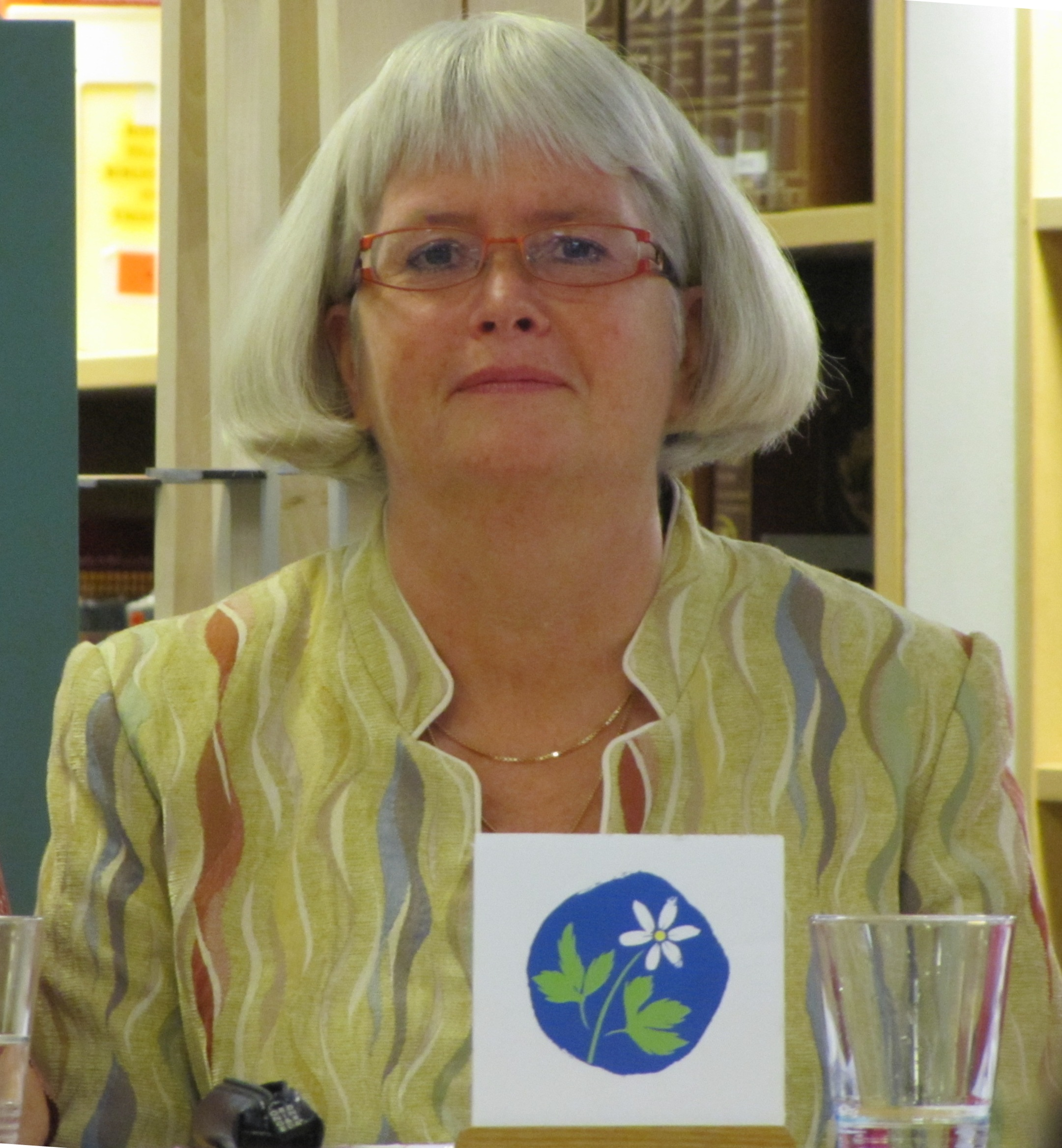
Annelie Enochson in 2010

Annelie Enochson (born 1953) is a Swedish Christian Democratic politician and architect. She was a member of the Riksdag between 2000 and 2014. She was a member of the Committee on Transport and Communications. She was also chairwoman of the Sweden–Israel Friendship Association.

She was born in raised in Gothenburg. She and her husband have two children. After leaving politics, she had surgery to remove a tumour.
