= Hugo Valentin =

Swedish historian

Hugo Mauritz Valentin
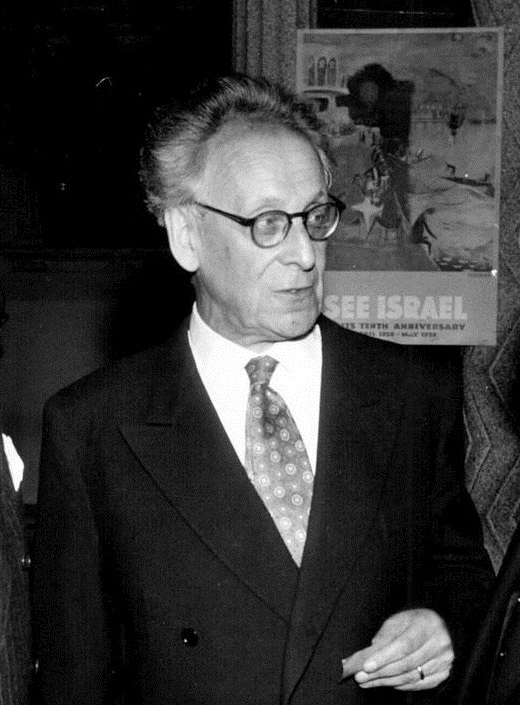
- Born: Hugo Mauritz Valentin; October 4, 1888; Vikingstad, Östergötland, Sweden
- Died: May 7, 1963 (aged 74); Uppsala, Sweden
- Occupations: Historian, Author, Lecturer

Hugo Mauritz Valentin (October 4, 1888 – May 7, 1963) was a Swedish historian, writer, and scholar in the field of Jewish history, particularly the history of Jews in Sweden, for which he has been labelled "The father of Swedish-Jewish history". He is also noted for his work on antisemitism and the Holocaust.

An honorary president and former chairman of the Swedish Zionist Federation, Valentin authored numerous works on Jewish history, antisemitism, and Zionism, part of which has been translated into English.

== Biography ==
=== Early life ===
Valentin was born in rural Östergötland County in Sweden, as the second child of the farmer Oskar Valentin from Gothenburg and his wife Berta Schönthal, who was born in Norrköping. Local church records stated that Valentin was not baptised and belonged to the "Mosaic confession". The Valentin family had established in Sweden in the early 19th century and had roots in Inowrocław, Poland.

=== Early academic career ===
Hugo Valentin's academic career began with a PhD from Uppsala University in 1916, with his early work mainly focusing on the Age of Liberty. In 1919, Valentin moved to with his wife Fanny Schiöler to Falun, where he took up a position as a lecturer at the Falu högre allmänna läroverk, a role he would hold for the next ten years.

Valentin then took up teaching at the Teachers Training College in Uppsala and at a high school. In 1930, he was appointed lecturer at the high school in Uppsala (Uppsala Högre Allmänna Läroverk). In the same year, he was awarded the title of Docent by the university, and later, in 1948, he was granted the honorary title of professor.

Valentin is best known for his work on the history of Jews in Sweden. His 1924 book "Judarnas historia i Sverige" (English: History of the Jews in Sweden) remains a key work in the field. He also published a shorter version, "Judarna i Sverige" (English: Jews in Sweden), which covered the situation of Jews in Sweden during the interwar period and the Second World War. This edition was expanded and republished in later years, with the most recent edition appearing in 2013. Valentin was among the first to write about the Scandinavian countries' responses to the Nazi persecution of Jews.

=== During World War II ===
Valentin was a committed anti-Nazi and democratic advocate. During World War II, Valentin disseminated early knowledge of the Holocaust. In October 1942, Valentin wrote a well-documented article in the influential daily newspaper Göteborgs Handels- och Sjöfartstidning, summarising available facts and mentioning the murder of 700,000 Jews in Poland by the Nazis. This article was widely quoted in Sweden. Valentin also continuously reported in Judisk Krönika on the Nazi mass murders of Jews in various parts of Europe.

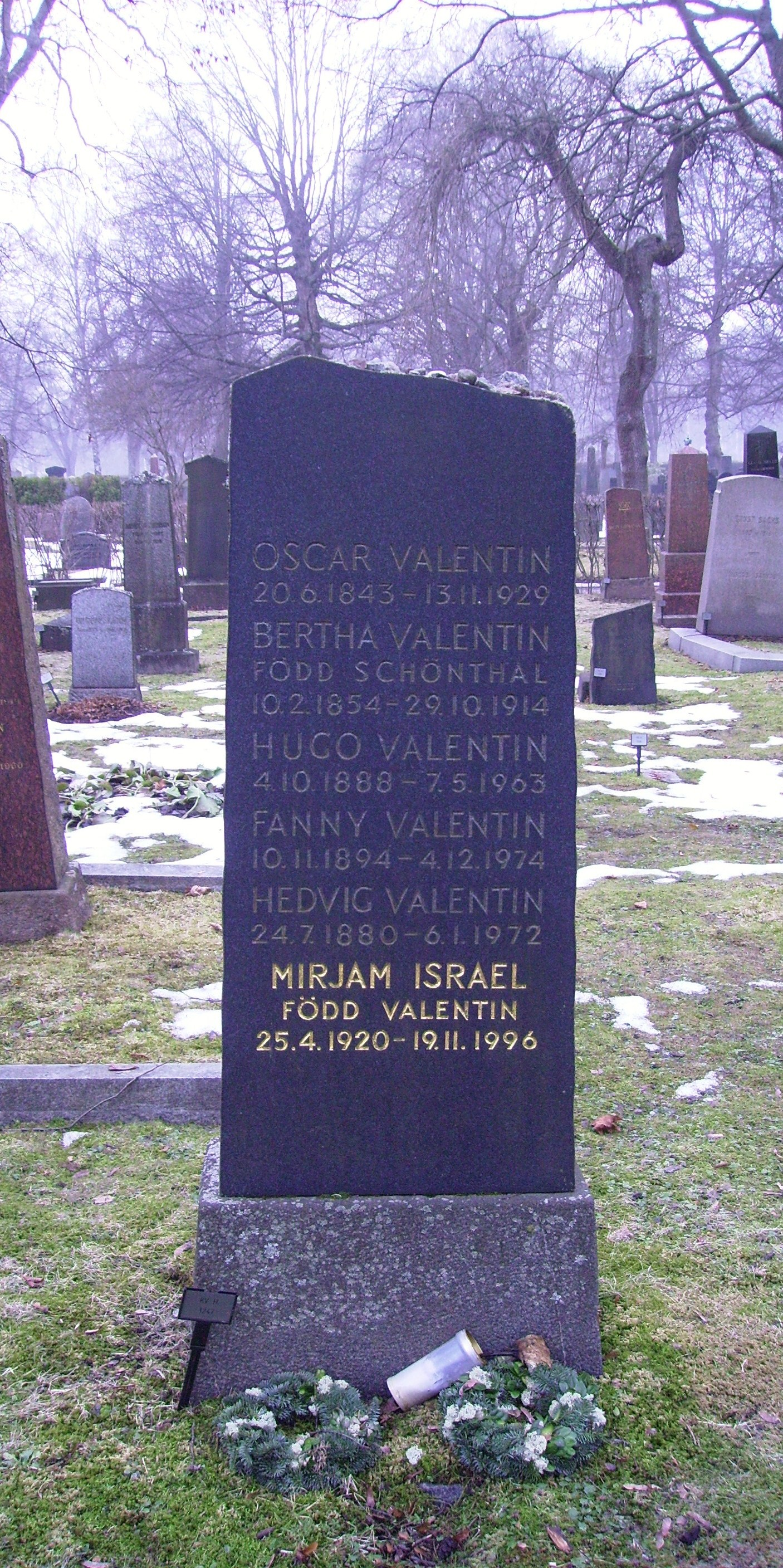
Valentin's grave at Judiska norra begravningsplatsen in Solna

=== After World War II ===
In 1945 Valentin was the first to write about the reception of the Holocaust survivors to Sweden. From 1951, Valentin edited the cultural magazine Judisk Tidskrift. In 1953, Valentin published an article in the YIVO Annual detailing the Scandinavian countries' responses to the Holocaust. Valentin was one of the founders of the Swedish section of the World Jewish Congress in 1944 and was appointed chairman in 1946. Valentin was strongly engaged in support of Israel. He was one of the initiators of the campaign that led to the formation of Sweden–Israel Friendship Association in 1953.

Valentin died in Uppsala in 1963, aged 74. He is buried in the Jewish cemetery at Norra begravningsplatsen in Solna, Stockholm. His daughter Mirjam (1920-1996) became a psychologist and child-rearing expert who co-authored the influential book "Det finns inga elaka barn" (There Are No Evil Children) in 1946 with her husband, Joachim Israel.

== Hugo Valentin Center at Uppsala University ==
The Hugo Valentin Centre was established at Uppsala University's Faculty of Arts in November 2009 through a merging of two previous units, the Centre for Multiethnic Research and The Uppsala Programme for Holocaust and Genocide Studies. The unit started its work under the new name on 1 January 2010 and on 1 January 2025 it was renamed to Uppsala Centre for Holocaust and Genocide Studies.

The renaming drew international criticism, including from historians Jan Grabowski and Christopher Browning, who argued in an open letter that removing Hugo Valentin’s name weakened the centre’s historical connection to Jewish history and Holocaust studies. Aron Verständig, Chair of the Swedish Jewish Central Council, called the decision a negative signal, particularly in a time of rising antisemitism. Uppsala University representatives defended the change, stating that the new name clarified the centre’s focus on Holocaust and genocide studies without altering its research mission.

== Works ==
- Frihetstidens riddarhus: några bidrag till dess karakteristik (Stockholm: Geber 1915) diss.
- Judarnas historia i Sverige (Stockholm: Bonnier, 1924).
- Antisemitism i historisk och kritisk belysning (1936).
- Antisemitism Historically and Critically Examined, trans. from Swedish by A. G. Chater (New York: The Viking Press, 1937) (Freeport, NY: Books for Libraries Press, 1971) ISBN 0-8369-5914-0
- 'Rescue and Relief Activities in behalf of Jewish Victims in. Scandinavia', in YIVO Annual of Jewish Social Science VIII (1953) s. 533–560.
- Judarna i Sverige (Stockholm: Bonnier, 1964).
