= Transmission Arts =

Transmission Arts, also sometimes known as Radio art, are defined "as a multiplicity of practices and media working with the idea of transmission or the physical properties of the Electromagnetic spectrum (radio). Transmission works often manifest themselves in participatory live art or time-based art, and include, but are not limited to, sound, video, light, installation, and performance."

By their very nature, transmission artworks engage the public, and respond to radio and broadcast histories and materials. Organizations such as Wave Farm facilitate artist exploration of transmission-based creativity.

== See also ==
- Audium (theater)
- Acoustic ecology
- Broadcasting
- Electronic music
- Fluxus
- Installation art
- Intermedia
- List of sound artists
- NIME
- Noise Music
- Performance art
- Radio art
- Slow-scan television
- Sonification
- Sound art
- Sound installation
- Sound map
- Sound poetry
- Sound sculpture
- Soundscape
- Soundscape ecology
- Visual music
