= Judisk Tidskrift =

Jewish cultural magazine in Sweden (1928–1966)

- Editor: Mordecai Ehrenpreis (1928–1951); Hugo Valentin (1951–1963); Franz Arnheim (1963–1966)
- Frequency: Monthly; Eight times annually
- Founder: Mordecai Ehrenpreis
- Founded: 1928
- First issue: January 1928
- Final issue: 1966
- Country: Sweden
- Based in: Stockholm
- Language: Swedish
- OCLC: 637376268

Judisk Tidskrift was a cultural and political Jewish journal which was published in Stockholm, Sweden, in the period 1928–1966. Judisk Krönika and the journal had high readership levels among the Jewish origin Swedes during the 1940s and 1950s.

== History and profile ==
Judisk Tidskrift was first published in Stockholm in January 1928. The founder of the journal was Mordecai Ehrenpreis. He was the chief Rabbi of Stockholm and edited the journal until his death in 1951. He modelled the journal after Martin Buber's Der Jude to which he had himself contributed. During the Nazi rule in Germany Judisk Tidskrift filled an important function as it published articles, reports, and editorials that informed Swedish Jews and also, gentile readers about the deterioration of the situation for Jews, exposed the mass-murdering, and called for interventions and protests. It also functioned as a medium for appeals for donations to Swedish Jewish aid efforts. From 1945 Judisk Tidskrift also published the calls for donations to the Swedish Section of World Jewish Congress of which Ehrenpreis was the chairman.

Hugo Valentin joined the journal in 1949 as deputy editor and replaced Ehrenpreis as editor of Judisk Tidskrift in 1951. Valentin edited the journal until his death in 1963, and an economist Franz Arnheim became the editor the same year.

Although the journal dealt with the Jewish cause following World War II, it was not a radical Zionist publication. Instead of dealing with specific events related to Jewish people in Sweden or in other countries Judisk Tidskrift featured articles covering intellectual discussions. Bernhard Tarschys, Eli F. Heckscher and Mia Leche Löfgren were among the local contributors. The journal also had international contributors who were well-known Jewish intellectuals: Erwin Leiser, Ernst Benedikt, Peter Patera and Martin Buber.

Judisk Tidskrift was published on a monthly basis between 1934 and 1964. Then it produced eight issues per year until 1966 when the journal folded.
