= Mordecai Ehrenpreis =

Swedish rabbi (1869–1951)

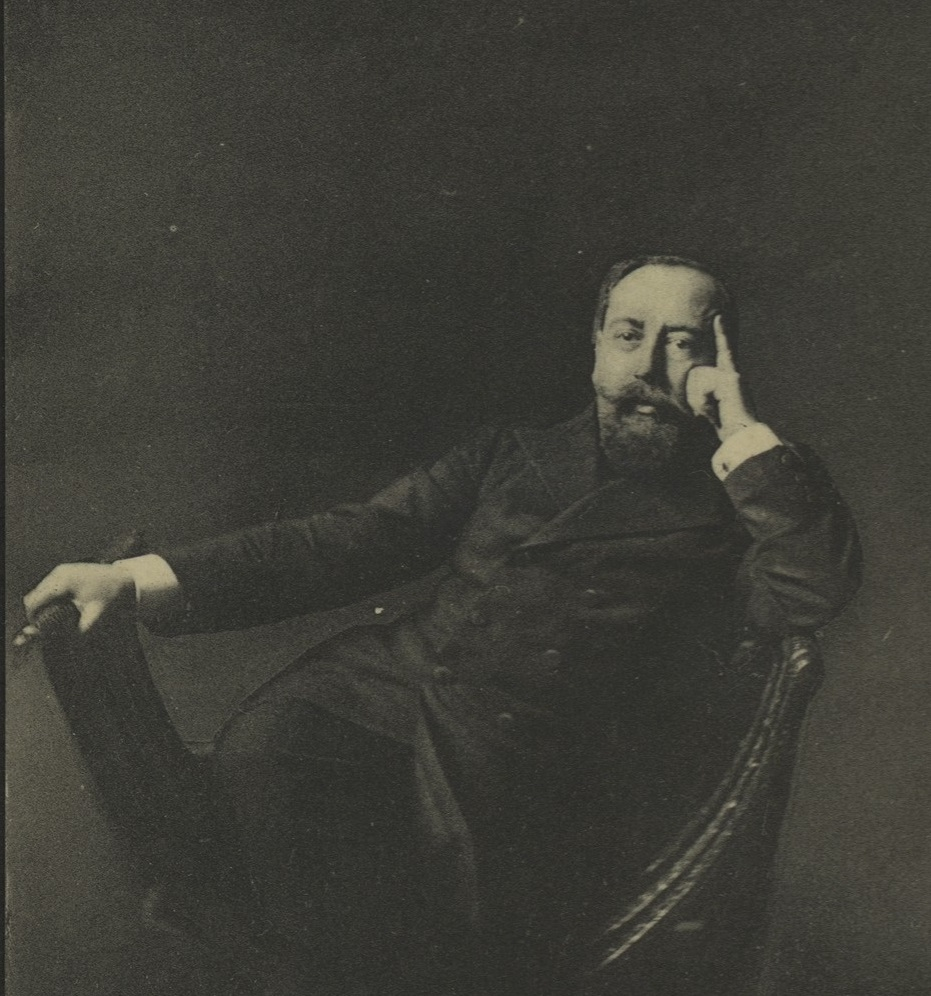
Mordecai Ehrenpreis, 1910

Mordecai Ehrenpreis (25 June 1869 – 26 February 1951) was a Hebrew author, publisher and Zionist activist. From 1914 until his death he served as chief rabbi of Stockholm.

== Biography ==
Mordechai (Marcus Wolf) Ehrenpreis was born in Lviv to Jacob Meschulem Ehrenpreis and Chaje Suss. As a young man, he wrote in Yiddish. He studied at German universities and the Hochschule für die Wissenschaft des Judentums in Berlin. From 1884 he wrote for the Hebrew newspapers Ha-Maggid and Ha-Meliz. In 1896, he married Esther Haskler. From 1896 to 1900 he was a rabbi in Đakovo, Croatia. Even before Herzl, Ehrenpreis, Nathan Birnbaum and others began to define the concept of a new national Judaism.

Ehrenpreis died in 1951 in Saltsjöbaden, Sweden.

== Zionist activism ==
Ehrenpreis was an early adherent of Zionism and helped Herzl establish the first Zionist Congress. He was a member of the Democratic Fraction, an opposition group at the Zionist Congress that lobbied for cultural as opposed to political Zionism. Ehrenpreis ultimately supported both views and wrote "Perhaps victory will go in the end to a third, synthetic view that will unite cultural and political Zionism together.” He was an avid supporter of teaching the Hebrew language to all Jewish children.

== Rabbinic and literary career ==
From 1900 to 1914 he was in Sofia as Chief rabbi of Bulgaria and also publisher of several Spaniolic magazines. After 1908 his interest in Zionism and in the Hebrew literature decreased noticeably which earned him some criticism. From 1914 until his death he served as chief rabbi of Stockholm.

In 1928 he founded the Judisk Tidskrift, was engaged as a translator as well as scientific writer for different encyclopedias, since 1935 he became a professor at Stockholm University. During his time in Sweden he published some 20 books in Swedish.

Ehrenpreis emphasized the importance of seeking understanding for Jewish culture in the modern world and sought to create a synthesis between a general culture and the inherited culture of the Jewish minority.

Ehrenpreis was the chairman of Arbetsutskottet för hjälp åt Polens judar, devoted to sending aid in the form of food, medicine, clothes and money, primarily to Poland but increasingly also to other parts of Nazi-occupied Europe.

Ehrenpreis was also the Chairman of the Swedish Section of World Jewish Congress from its institution in 1944 and was succeeded by historian and pioneering scholar of antisemitism, Hugo Valentin. Ehrenpreis was also involved in planning the attempt by Raoul Wallenberg to rescue Hungarian Jews. Wallenberg visited him at his home on 5 July, the evening before he left for Budapest. Ehrenpreis was consequently one of the last people to see Wallenberg alive in Sweden.

Ehrenpreis's conduct during this period has been a subject of historical debate. Some contemporaries and later historians criticized the leadership of the Stockholm Jewish community, including Ehrenpreis, for a cautious and largely reactive approach to Jewish refugee rescue efforts, and disputes arose between the community, the Joint Distribution Committee, and figures such as Hillel Storch of the World Jewish Congress over the handling of relief and rescue work. Other historians, including Göran Rosenberg and Pontus Rudberg, have argued that much of this criticism stemmed from personal and political rivalries among Jewish organizations rather than from failures specific to Ehrenpreis, while acknowledging that more could plausibly have been done to save additional refugees.

== Awards and recognition ==
In 1935, the King of Sweden conferred on him the title of Professor. Earlier, he was decorated by the King with the Order of Chevalier of the North Star.

== Popular Culture ==
He is depicted in the 2026 movie The Swedish Connection, played by Loa Falkman, during the events leading up to the Rescue of the Danish Jews.
