= Steve Heimbecker =

Canadian sound artist

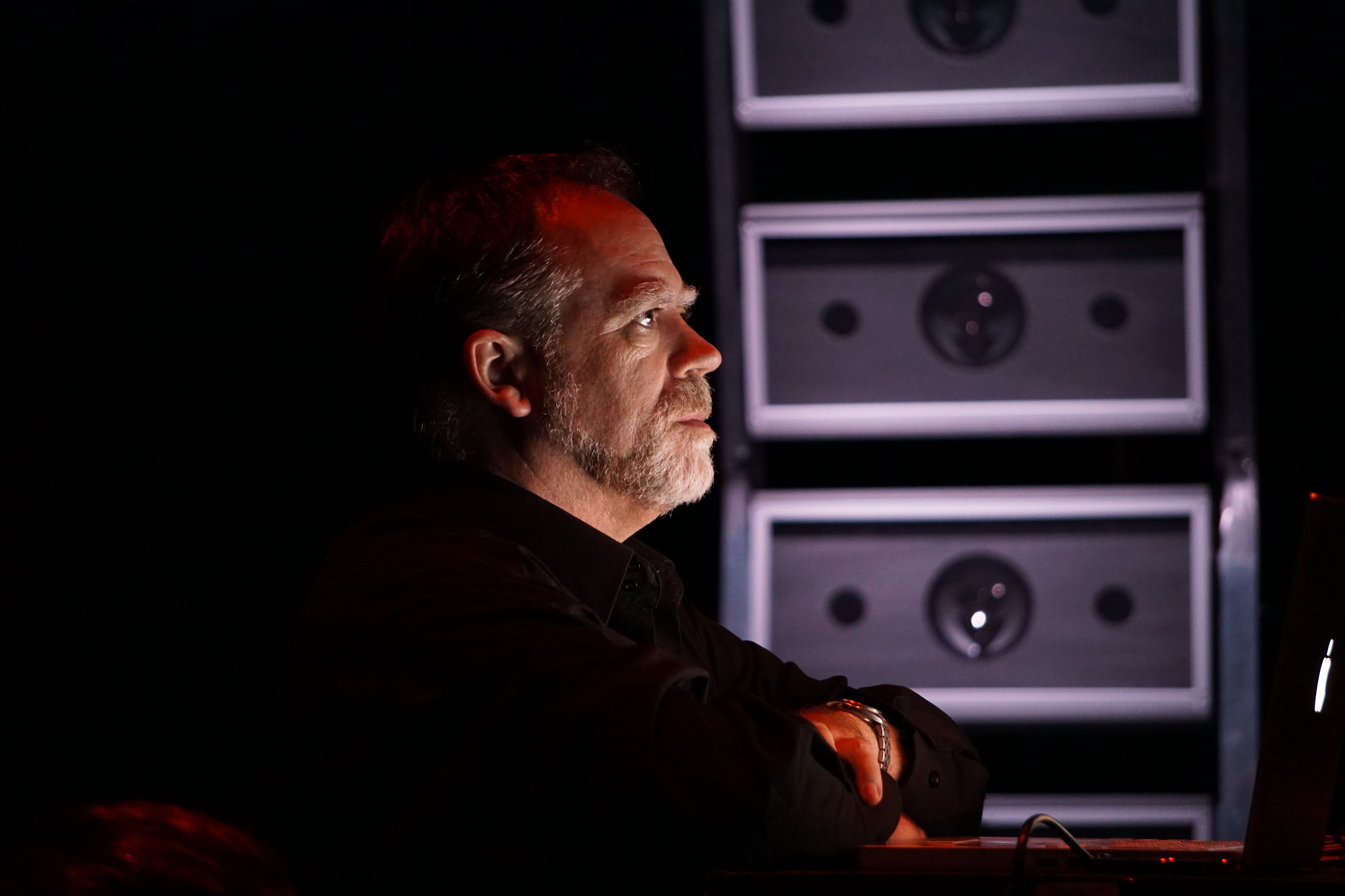
- Heimbecker in 2015
- Born: Springwater, Saskatchewan, Canada
- Education: Alberta College of Art (ACA), Calgary, Alberta
- Known for: Sound and electronic artist New media artist
- Notable work: Soundpool: The Manufacturing of Silence (1996)
- Website: www.steveheimbecker.net

Steve Heimbecker (born 1959) is a Canadian sound artist, pioneer of sound art in Canada. His works are part of the collection of the Musée national des beaux-arts du Québec and the Alberta Foundation for the Arts. His work has been exhibited in Canada, the United States, Peru and Europe.

== Life ==
Heimbecker was born in Springwater, Saskatchewan in 1959 and studied fine arts at the Alberta College of Art (ACA). He lived and worked in Calgary, Alberta, in Saskatchewan, in Montreal and currently lives and works in the Eastern Townships in Quebec.

He is the recipient of two honorary mentions for the Prix Ars Electronica, a first in 2005 in the category "Interactive art" for his work POD: Wind Array Cascade Machine and a second in 2009, in the category "Digital music and sound art ", for The Turbulence Sound Matrix: Signe.

== Work ==
Since the 1980s Steve Heimbecker's two main areas of research and creation are the acousmatic (spatial experience of sound), sculpture and sound installation. He thus seeks to study our relationship to the sound environment and the influence of technologies on it, in the wake of the work of R. Murray Schafer. The artist uses the expression "sound pool" to describe his practice in sound art. He adopted the expression in particular to title a project he carried out in 1996, Soundpool: The Manufacturing of Silence.

== Notable work ==
=== The Turbulence Sound Matrix: Signe (2008) ===
The Turbulence Sound Matrix (TMS) is an installation composed of a network of 64-channel speakers forming an immersive sound environment. Signe is a sound art composition designed specifically for TMS and formed of three layers of sound: wind, typewriter and grand piano.

=== POD: Wind Array Cascade Machine (2003) ===
The POD installation: Wind Array Cascade Machine is made up of two modules. The first module is composed of sixty-four metal rods equipped with motion sensors installed on a roof whose purpose is to record wind fluctuations. This first module is connected to the second, shown in an exhibition hall and formed by sixty-four other poles on which 2880 light-emitting diodes are integrated, which turn on and off at the rate of the wind picked up by the first outdoor module. The data captured by the work are transmitted live on the internet. The electronic and software components of the installation are developed with the team of the artist center Avatar.

The work was shown at the Méduse cooperative in Quebec in 2003 as part of the Mois Multi 2 event, at the Langlois Foundation and at Oboro in Montreal, then at the Kiasma Museum of Contemporary Art in Helsinki, Finland, in the part of the International Symposium on Electronic Art (ISEA) in 2004. The piece joined the contemporary art collection of the Musée national des beaux-arts du Québec in 2013.

=== The Enormouslessness of Cloud Machines (1999) ===
The Enormouslessness of Cloud Machines is an anthology published in the Ohm-Avatar catalog. The double album brings together eight works by the artist produced between 1992 and 1998: Engine: An Octaphonic Movement (1992), Drip Doodle # 1 (1995), Tic Talk # 1, Feathers and Flies # 1 (1998), Elevator Music, The Forum for the Alienation of Art, SpinCycle, Untitled.

=== Soundpool: The Manufacturing of Silence (1996) ===
Soundpool is an artistic proposal playing with humor on the principle of acoustic insulation which aims to cancel the noise by the superposition of a layer of sound waves whose phase is reversed. The installation includes eight large format paintings arranged in the center of a room and activated as loudspeakers by eight motors. It was first presented at the Illingworth Kerr Gallery in Calgary in 1996. During the same year, the artist continued to develop the work as part of a residency at the Avatar artist run center in Quebec. It is also presented in Quebec (1996), Edmonton (1996) and Montreal (2001).

== Bibliography ==
- Nicole Gingras. Le son dans l'art contemporain canadien, Éditions Artextes, 2003 (ISBN 2-9802870-9-1 et 978-2-9802870-9-1), (OCLC 53792563).
- Sabine Breitsameter, Claudia Soller-Eckert, The Global Composition: Conference on Sound, Media, and the Environment, Proceedings, Media Campus Dieburg / Hochschule Darmstadt, 2012 (ISBN 978-3-00-038817-0).
- Dominique Moulon. Art Contemporain Nouveaux Médias - Sentiers d'art, Nouvelles Editions Scala, Paris, 2011 (ISBN 978-2-35988-038-0).
- Groupe de Recherche en Sociologie des Œuvres, et Conseil des arts de Montréal. « Les arts numériques à Montréal. Création/innovation/diffusion ». Ministère des Affaires municipales, des Régions et de l’Occupation du territoire, 2011.
- Stephen Wilson. Art + Science Now, A visual survey of artists working at the frontiers of science and technology, Thames & Hudson, 2010 (ISBN 9780500238684).
- Bernard Schütze, « Earth, Wind and a Banana », ETC, no 85, 2009, p. 11–14 (ISSN 0835-7641 et 1923-3205).
- « Pedigree », Art le Sabord, no 83, 2009 (ISSN 1485-8800).
- Steven Connor. « Air: Next to Nothing », TATE ETC., 12, Tate Media / Tate Gallery, Londres, 2008 (ISSN 1743-8853).
- Anna Friz. « Steve Heimbecker at Work and Play in the Soundpool », Musicworks, no 94, 2006.
- A. M. Richard, C. Robertson. Performance au-in Canada, Éditions Intervention / Coach House Press, Québec, 1991 (ISBN 2-920500-04-X).
