= Hjördis Levin =

Swedish historian and author (born 1930)

Hildur Charlotta "Hjördis" Levin (née Eriksson; born 4 June 1930) is a Swedish historian and author whose field of research is patriarchal history; Neo-Malthusianism, birth control laws in Sweden and changing sexual relations within patriarchy.

== Early years and education ==
Hildur Charlotta Eriksson was born in Smedby, Östergötland County on 4 June 1930. Levin is the daughter of the gardener Karl Erik Karlsson and Hildur Schwarz. she studied office education at an early age and was an office employee until 1968. She received a B.A. degree in 1971, and earned a doctoral degree at Umeå University in 1994. She was a course leader in speech and argumentation techniques in Stockholm from 1973, and worked as a speech trainer in her own company, Juno Speech Training, from 1986.

== Books and academic papers ==
Levin's 1994 thesis "Masken inuti rosen - Nymalthusianism och födelsekontroll i Sverige 1880-1910. Propaganda och motstånd" (Neo-Malthusianism and Birth Control in Sweden 1880–1910. Propaganda and Resistance) deals with the sexual debate in 1880–1910 and how it led to the so-called Preventive Law in 1910, which prohibited the dissemination of use or knowledge of contraception among the public. She details how influence of French authors such as Marquis de Sade, had a profound impact on the Swedish debate in that it sparked a strong resistance to bohème literature, and gave rise to a new morality. Other deciding factors in the debate on birth control were fear of STD's, prostitution and fear of workers having less children, thus reducing the labor force.

Levin has since continued to survey and describe the subsequent period 1923–1936 with a women's struggle for sexual equality and gender equality, and which led, among other things, to the abolition of the Prevention Act 1938.

In "Testiklarnas herravälde" (The Empire of Testicles) (1986, 352 pages) she draws a history of how sexual morals, albeit changing, always have benefited men's contemporary desires and interests.

In "Kampen mot den vita slavhandeln" (2015) she writes about the "white slave trade" at the end of the 1800s. As it was discovered that minor British girls were sold to Belgian brothels, a national society was formed to combat trafficking.

== Political engagement ==
Levin has worked as an employee of the Swedish Women's Left Federation's magazine Vi Mänskor from 1969. She has also written articles for, among other things, Kvinnobulletinen and Acca and has been active as a lecturer. She was an employee of Focus in the 1980s and wrote biographical articles on women for Svenskt biografiskt lexikon.

Levin has been active since the 1970s in the Swedish Women's Left Federation and Group 8. She has also been a municipal political activist for the Left Party in Stockholm Municipality as a member of the social district committee in Social District 9 (southern Farsta). She is a member of the Swedish Writers' Association since 1988, and member of the Swedish Women's Left Federation's National Board.

Her husband was Jonny Levin (1926–1955).

== Selected works ==
- Blå safir (dikter, 1965)
- Testiklarnas herravälde: Sexualmoralens historia (1986, utökad upplaga 1989)
- Elisabeth Tamm på Fogelstad: en radikal herrgårdsfröken (1989)
- Masken uti rosen: nymalthusianism och födelsekontroll i Sverige 1880–1910 (doktorsavhandling, 1994)
- Kvinnorna på barrikaden: sexualpolitik och sociala frågor 1923–36 (1997)
- En radikal herrgårdsfröken: Elisabeth Tamm på Fogelstad – liv och verk (2003)
- Kampen mot "vita slavhandeln" : trafficking i historiskt perspektiv (2015)
- Flickebarnet i sävlådan: en tragisk historia från det fattiga Sverige (2017)
