= Timo Kahlen =

German sound sculptor and media artist (born 1966)

Timo Kahlen (born 1966 in Berlin) is a German sound sculptor and media artist who currently lives and works in Berlin.

== Life and work ==
Timo Kahlen is known for his sound sculptures and site-specific sound art works, installations with steam, wind and light, as well as experimental net art, video and photography. His interdisciplinary and intermedia body of work, often employing ephemeral, elemental materials such as wind and steam, light and shade, sound and vibration, noise and beauty, has been nominated for the German national Sound Art Prize 2006, the Kahnweiler Prize for Sculpture 2001 and the Prize for Young European Photographers 1989, as well as various scholarships in Washington D.C., Berlin, Paris and Guernsey. Kahlen's work is involved with the sculptural and conceptual aspects of immaterial phenomena and processes, and curators as Joanna Littlejohns have emphasized the ephemeral, "temporary and changeable nature" of his concentrated oeuvre. Kahlen's work has been presented in more than 140 exhibitions and retrospectives of contemporary media art since the mid-1980s, including Sound Art: Sound as a Medium of the Arts (ZKM Center for Arts and Media Technologies, Karlsruhe 2012–2013), the Mediations Biennale (Poland 2012), Tonspur_expanded: The Loudspeaker (Vienna, 2010–11), Noise & Beauty (Berlin 2010), 60 × 60 (New York 2010), Manifesta 7: Scenarios (Italy 2008), Sound Art: German Sound Art Prize 2006 (Marl and Cologne 2006), Wireless Experience (Helsinki 2004), Zeitskulptur: Volumen als Ereignis (Linz 1997) and the solo exhibition Timo Kahlen: Works with Wind (1991), inaugurating the Kunst-Werke in Berlin.

His installation at the Aviation Museum in Amberg in 2010 was disrupted when a cleaner mistakenly vacuumed up the two dead hornets he had placed on a loudspeaker: the installation was titled Tanz für Insekten (dance for insects) and the intention was for the dead insects to "dance" as a result of the vibrations. Rather than kill more hornets, he replaced them with dead houseflies.

Kahlen received his Master of Fine Arts degree from the Berlin University of the Arts, where he studied under Professor Dieter Appelt and held a lectureship in Visual Media and Video Art from 1993 to 1998.

== Exhibitions (selection) ==
- 2013: Media Art Histories: Renew, International Conference, Riga / Latvia
- 2012: Sound Art: Sound as a Medium of the Arts, ZKM Center for Art and Media Technologies, Karlsruhe / Germany
- 2012: Mediations Biennale: The Unknown, Poznan / Poland
- 2012: Directors Lounge, Berlin / Germany
- 2011: Ruido de Fronteira: Eletronika Festival, Belo Horizonte / Brazil
- 2011: An Exchange with Sol LeWitt, MASS MoCA, Massachusetts / USA
- 2011: Luftkunst, Zeppelin Museum, Friedrichshafen / Germany
- 2010: Tonspur_expanded: The Loudspeaker, freiraum Quartier21, Vienna / Austria
- 2010: SIGHT.SOUND (INTERACTION) 5, Maryland Institute College of Art, Baltimore / USA
- 2009: naturasnaturans, Casello delle Polveri, Certosa, Venice / Italy
- 2008: MANIFESTA 7 Biennale, Fortezza / Italy
- 2007: Sonic Image: Totally Huge New Music Festival, Perth Institute of Contemporary Art, Perth / Australia
- 2007: Strictly Berlin, Berlin / Germany
- 2006: Sound Art: Deutscher Klangkunst-Preis 2006, Art Cologne, Cologne / Germany
- 2006: Timo Kahlen: Earcatcher, Ruine der Kuenste Berlin, Berlin / Germany
- 2006: Deutscher Klangkunst-Preis 2006, Skulpturenmuseum Glaskasten Marl / Germany
- 2006: 40jahrevideokunst.de – was fehlt?, Deutscher Kuenstlerbund, Berlin / Germany
- 2005: Media Dirt, Ruine der Kuenste Berlin, Berlin / Germany
- 2004: Wireless Experience, ISEA 2004 at Kiasma National Museum of Contemporary Art, Helsinki / Finland
- 2002: Zewidewit Zizidaeh, Galerie im Saalbau, Berlin /Germany
- 2001: Timo Kahlen, the gallery, International Artist in Residence Programme, Guernsey / GB
- 2001: Staubrauschen, Galerie Pankow, Berlin / Germany
- 2000: Licht. Zeit. Klang. Raum, Schwartzsche Villa, Berlin / Germany
- 2000: Liquid Light, Galerie im Parkhaus, Berlin / Germany
- 1997: Zeitskulptur: Volumen als Ereignis, Oberoesterreichische Landesgalerie, Linz / Austria
- 1997: Stroemung, Soma Projektgalerie, Berlin / Germany
- 1995: Stipendiaten der Karl-Hofer-Gesellschaft, Berlin / Germany
- 1995: Leerraum, Ruine der Kuenste Berlin, Berlin / Germany
- 1995: Lichtstaub, Galerie Voges + Deisen, Frankfurt am Main / Germany
- 1994: 3 Deutschland, DC Arts Center, Washington D.C. / USA
- 1994: Art(s) d'Europe: Emerging Artists in Europe Today, Goethe-Institut Paris / France
- 1993: Immaterialien, Galerie Voges + Deisen, Frankfurt am Main / Germany
- 1992: (ueber Zeit) am Bauhaus, Bauhaus Dessau / Germany
- 1992: Kunststudenten stellen aus, Bonner Kunstverein, Bonn / Germany
- 1992: Deutscher Kuenstlerbund, Ludwig Forum für Internationale Kunst, Aachen / Germany
- 1991: Die Ruine der Kuenste Berlin, Kunsthalle Palazzo, Basel / Switzerland
- 1991: Photography as Object, Galerie Ghislave, Paris / France
- 1991: Objekte in Originalgroeße, Hochschule der Künste Berlin, Berlin / Germany
- 1991: Timo Kahlen: Arbeiten mit Wind, KUNST-WERKE Berlin / Germany
- 1989: Prize for Young European Photographers, Frankfurter Kunstverein, Frankfurt am Main / Germany
- 1989: Timo Kahlen: Erste Arbeiten, Ruine der Kuenste Berlin, Berlin / Germany
