= Pierre Redon =

- Born: June 29, 1976 (age 50); Clermont-Ferrand
- Genres: Contemporary Art, Avant-garde music, Marche Sonore
- Occupations: Composer, sound artist, transdisciplinary artist.
- Website: www.pierreredon.com

Pierre Redon is a French avant-garde music composer and transdisciplinary artist. He is also an author, musician, producer, photographer, filmmaker, known for Marche Sonore and founder of the multimedia studio Les Soeurs Grées.

== Biography ==
From 2003 onwards, through the practice of field recording, sound in landscape becomes a central axis of his art, and he brings into play the relationship to the landscape, which he defines as a border; a state of awareness of the sensory relationship to the environment. His work opens up to plastic art installations, drawing art, documentary film, image, with walking progressively integrated as a corporal and sensory approach to places.

Pierre Redon is notably the creator of the Marches Sonores, a composite project that weaves the words of the inhabitants together with sound and cartography. Equipped with a sound player, walkers experience a new and augmented perception of places through the accompanying presence of the artwork. This art form was designed and implemented for the first time at the Markstein in the Vosges, France, with partners concerned about environmental issues and eager to experiment new aesthetics building processes. The maps accompanying the Marches Sonores are unique in their ability to challenge our sense of direction, but visually, they also give a sensory and critical representation of the territory.

In 2016, Redon inaugurated a monumental creation spanning five years of work. The Sounds from Beyond (Les Sons des Confins) comprises a series of 8 Marches Sonores over more than 600 kilometers, from the source of the Vienne river, following this river's bed all the way to the estuary of the Loire River. This creation, which brings together several partners, is part of a public art commission from the French Ministry of Culture and Communication This commission stands out as an exemplary project with the C.N.A.P. (French national center for plastic arts) by offering a new perspective on art in public spaces through an immaterial art form, sound art. The ensuing publication comes with a text by art critic and essayist Christophe Domino.

His work on hypnosis and healing, which he initiated in 2015 with the Marche Sonore, Lichen, body, gender and sexuality, commissioned by the city of Reims with the intersex activist Hida Viloria, opens up new routes in his approach to documentary work, ecology and healing. He has developed a form of organic and instinctive music combining multiple approaches to composition, with musicians from every musical horizon; graphic score, improvisation, oral communication, instrumental techniques or electroacoustics.

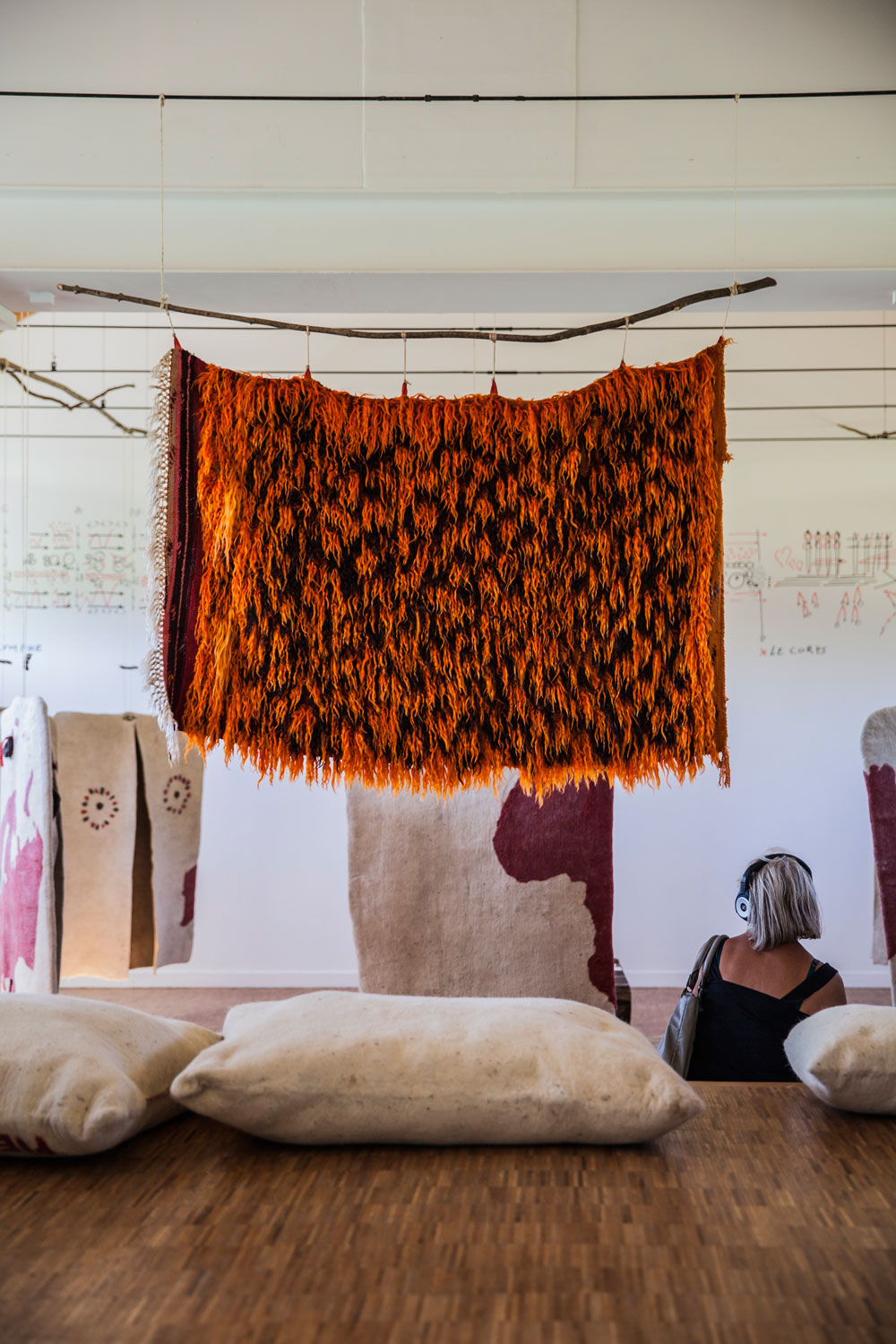
Tülü by Pierre Redon at C.I.A.P. l'Île de Vassivière.

This approach is particularly present in the musical part of Tülü. In this sound, textile and participative opus, Redon shows that to him, sound is no longer merely music, but rather that it shapes a transcendental body experience. Here, sound is a prelude to the participative ritual that invites the public to donate a strand of their hair and a drawing on the theme of birth, in order to "weave the memory of humanity in a rug of hair". This international art endeavor has already been exhibited in China at the MCAM (Ming Contemporary Art Museum) in Shanghai and in South America, at the Teatro Jorge Eliécer Gaitán, the Museo de Trajes in Bogotá and the Cementerio Museo San Pedro in Medellín.

From 2001 to 2020, Pierre Redon worked on developing a creation called "9" Sound and Healing where the relationship of body and sound is at the forefront, as well as his research on transgenerational memories. In particular, he questions the links between magic and science, by organizing a conference with psychiatrists from the Cadillac Hospital Center (France), entitled "Quand les magiciens rencontrent les scientifiques" (When magicians meet scientists).

== Works ==
=== Marches Sonores ===
- 2016: Les Sons des Confins – Commande publique Artistique du Ministère de la Culture (France)
- 2015: Lichen, corps, genre et sexualité - Édition MF & Les Sœurs Grées / commande de la Ville de Reims
- 2015: Lola – commissioned by Art Connexion & Slack Deux-Caps art Festival / Audinghen
- 2011: Vestiges ou les Fondements d’une Cyberécologie - Éditions MF / Saint-Ouen-L’aumône
- 2009: Marche Sonore EAU # 1 & EAU # 2 (Nemini Parco) - Éditions MF / Faux-la-Montagne & Felletin
- 2007: Marche Sonore au Markstein – Paysage Montagnard #1 Le Markstein

=== Exhibitions ===
- 2019: Tülü / McaM (Ming Contemporary Art Museum) in the field of Festival « croisements » from the French Institut Shanghai.=
- 2018: Les Sons des Confins / L’Ascenseur Végétal - Bordeaux (33-FR)
- 2017: Ce que le roi ne voit pas / Château d’Oiron Centre des Monuments Nationaux, interactive sound work.
- 2017: Tülü / Museo de Trajes Regionales in Bogota, Théâtre Jorge Eliécer Gaitán & Musée Cimetière San Pedro in Medellin.
- 2014: Les rencontres du Tülü / Cité internationale de la Tapisserie & Scène Nationale d’Aubusson (23).
- 2013: Tülü / CIAP (International Centre for Art and Landscape) de l’île de Vassivière.

=== Filmography ===
- 2020: « 9 » Sound & Healing. Online documentary series produced by Les Sœurs Grées
- 2009: Miage, a film by Edmond Carrère and Pierre Redon, production: Pyramide production, DVD: Les Films du Paradoxe.

=== Film Music ===
- 2014: Le Silence & la Douleur – director: Patrick Séraudie (Pyramide productions)
- 2011: Une vie avec Oradour – director: Patrick Séraudie (Pyramide productions)
- 2009 : Miage - director: Edmond Carrère & Pierre redon (Pyramide production)
- 2009 : Au bout de la Nuit – director: Patrick Séraudie (Pyramide productions)
- 2008: La Petite Russie – director Patrick Séraudie (Pyramide productions)
- 2007: Une Histoire Galicienne – director: Patrick Séraudie (Pyramide productions)

== Publishing ==
=== Discography ===
- 2025 : "Entre Fuego Y Nieve" (EP) - Pierre Redon - label : Les Sœurs Grées - digital
- 2025 : "Shadow Noise" - Pierre Redon & toy.bizarre - label : Les Sœurs Grées - digital
- 2022 : "Miage" - original soundtrack (recorded in 2009) - label : Les Sœurs Grées - digital
- 2020 : "Chakras & 5 Éléments", with ensemble 9 - label : Les Sœurs Grées - CD and digital
- 2018 : "Tülü" - avec l’Ensemble Tülü label : Les Sœurs Grées - Vinyle and digital
- 2008 : "Saisons" - Toy.bizarre & Pierre Redon -label : AufAbwegen – CD and digital
- 2002 : "Solo" – label : L’Oreille Électronique - CD

=== Bibliography ===
- 2018: Tülü - Éditions Loco, ISBN 978-2-84314-004-4 -Original serigraphy, two books, vinyl record.
- 2016: Les Sons des Confins - Éditions Loco, ISBN 9782919507511 - interactive book: photography book, journal, tarot card decks, Smartphone App.
- 2011: Vestiges ou les fondements d’une cyberécologie - Éditions MF, collection Dehors, ISBN 9782915794540 – book, map, CD.
- 2015: Lichen, body gender and sexuality - MF Éditions, ISBN 978-2915794656 – interactive book: with Smartphone App.
- 2009: Marche Sonore EAU # 1 & EAU # 2 (Nemini Parco) / Faux-la-Montagne & Felletin (23) - Éditions MF, ISBN 978-2-9157-9461-8
