= Gerda Philipsborn =

Educationist and social reformer

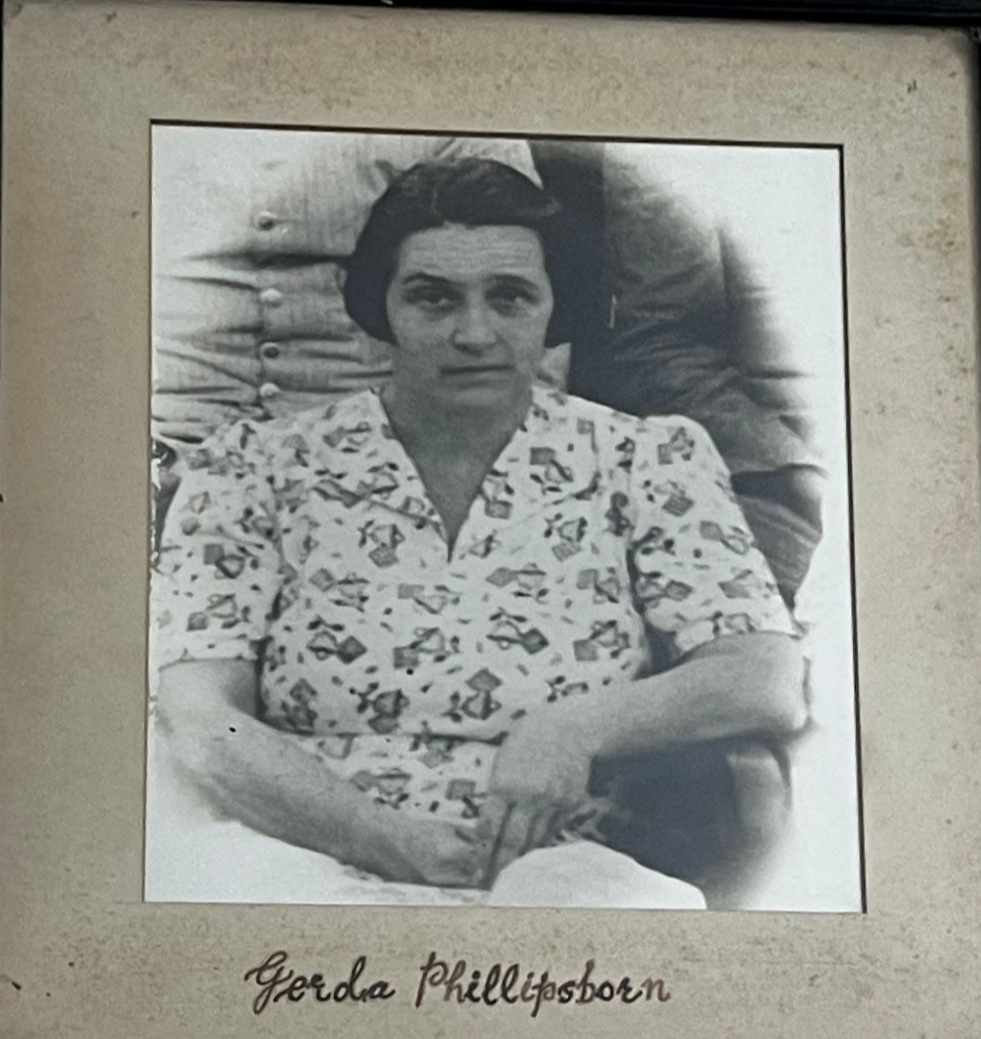
- Born: 30 April 1895; Kiel, Prussia, German Empire
- Died: 14 April 1943 (aged 47); Delhi, Punjab, British India
- Resting place: Jamia's graveyard 28°33′47.708″N 77°17′9.493″E
- Other name: Jamia's Aapa Jaan
- Occupations: Educationist, Social reformer
- Movement: Indian independence movement

Gerda Philipsborn (30 April 1895 – 14 April 1943) was a German-born educator who made significant contributions to the early development of Jamia Millia Islamia, a central university in Delhi, India. Known for her commitment to youth education and social reform, she is called as the "Aapa Jaan" (elder sister) of Jamia.

== Early life and education ==
Born in Kiel in 1895, Philipsborn was educated and trained as an opera singer. In Berlin, she initiated her own kindergarten and worked in the Jewish People's home. She was involved in fundraising for the Ben Shemen Youth Village project, an agricultural boarding school in Mandatory Palestine, where she taught in 1932. She was also associated with a Berlin asylum organization for refugee children.

== Move to India ==
In 1921, Gerda met three Indian students, Zakir Husain, Abid Husain, and Mohammad Mujeeb, who later became the founders of Jamia Millia Islamia and also played important roles in shaping India's political history, with Zakir Husain becoming the country's third president in 1967. She met them while they were studying in Berlin. The trio shared their vision of creating an educational institution in India free from colonial influence with her. Their discussions introduced Gerda to the ideas of Gandhian self-sustenance and the role of education in the Indian independence movement. Influenced by these ideas, she moved to India in December 1932 and joined Jamia Millia Islamia in January 1933.

== Contributions to Jamia Millia Islamia ==
Philipsborn played a crucial role in shaping the institution's nursery and primary school sections. She introduced innovative teaching methods that she had learned in Germany and dedicated her life to the development of the institution.

She was actively involved in the creative and personal development of the students. She initiated "Piyami Baradari", an educational society that facilitated children's writings and correspondence across the country. She also launched an international children's journal called "Payam-i-Talim" (Messages of Education), which encouraged creative expression through arts and crafts. She organized regular health check-ups and extracurricular activities for students, while serving as the warden for the children's hostel.

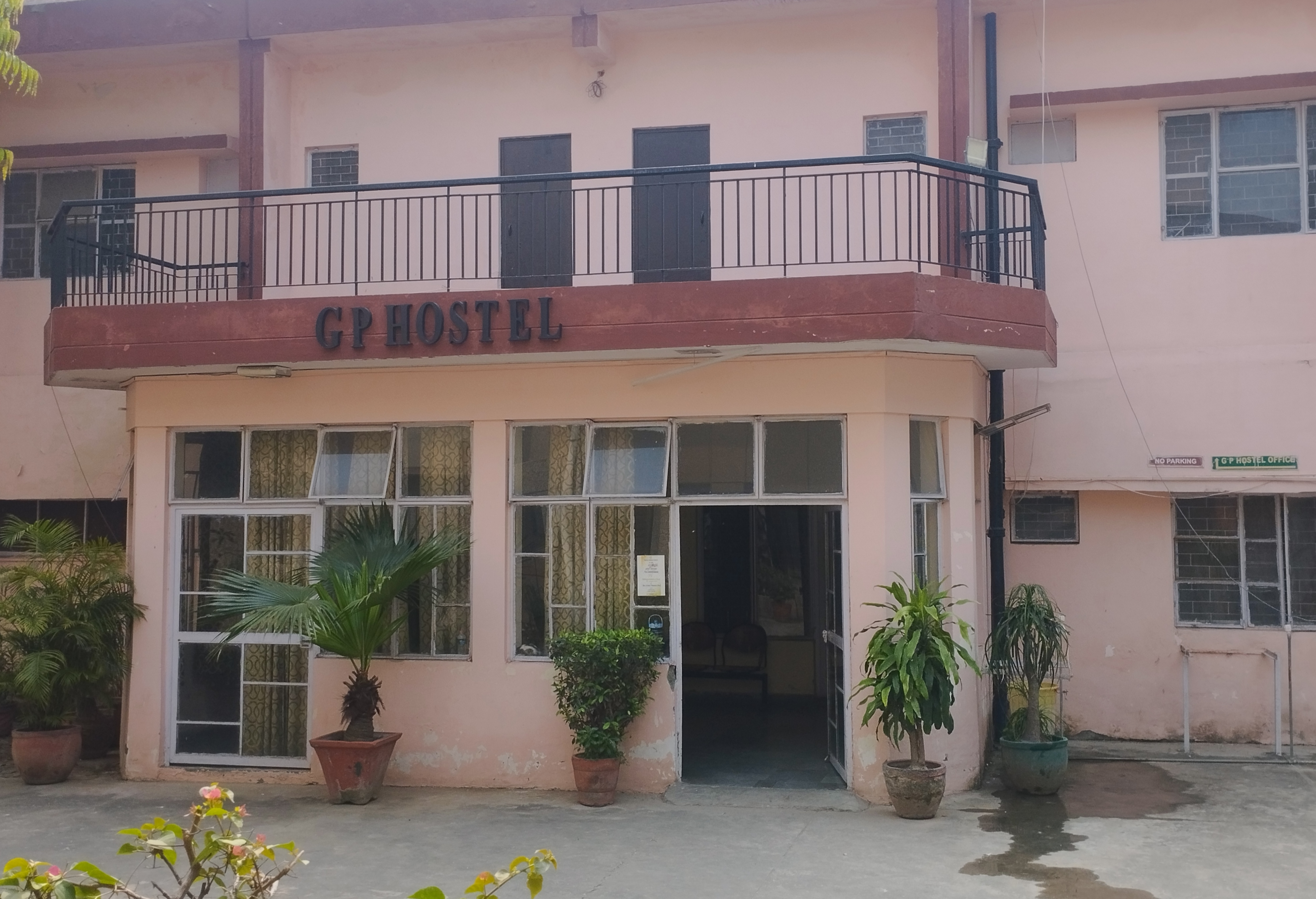
Hostel in Jamia Millia Islamia named after Philipsborn

Philipsborn introduced arts and crafts, such as embroidery and knitting, to women at Gandhi's ashram in Sevagram. In addition, she was actively involved in helping women who were traditionally excluded from public roles to participate in educational and community events at Jamia.

== World War II ==
Philipsborn, as a German national in British India, was arrested and interned at the Purandhar camp in 1940 under suspicion of being an enemy of the British Empire. There, she maintained her spirit, nursing fellow inmates and organizing events to lift morale. However, her health deteriorated during this period. After her release, she returned to Jamia but struggled with declining health due to a gastric ulcer that later became cancerous.

== Death and legacy ==
Philipsborn died in April 1943 and was buried in the Jamia graveyard. Her contributions to the institution, particularly in the early years, have been under-appreciated and unnoticed in mainstream historical accounts. Though much of her personal life remains undocumented, her impact on Jamia Millia Islamia and the broader Indian educational landscape continues to be acknowledged by scholars and students. Her legacy is remembered at Jamia, where a daycare center and a girls' hostel have been named in her honor.

Scholars such as Syeda Hameed have referred to Philipsborn as an "invisible architect" of Jamia and one of Jamia's "Khatoon-e-Awwal" (Jamia's number one woman).
