= Gerda Palm =

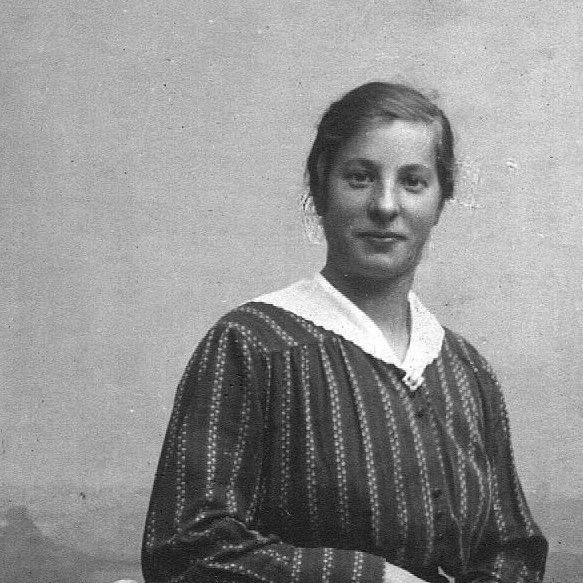
- Born: 14 October 1871; Ånimskogs parish
- Died: 25 January 1949 (aged 77); Gothenburg
- Known for: painting

Gerda Palm (14 October 1871 – 25 January 1949) was a Swedish painter who studied in Stochholm. She exhibited from before the first war until the 1940s. She has painting in Swedish collections.

== Life ==
Palm was born in 1871 in Ånimskogs parish. Her parents were Major Henrik Salomon Ferdinand Palm and Amalia Fröding.

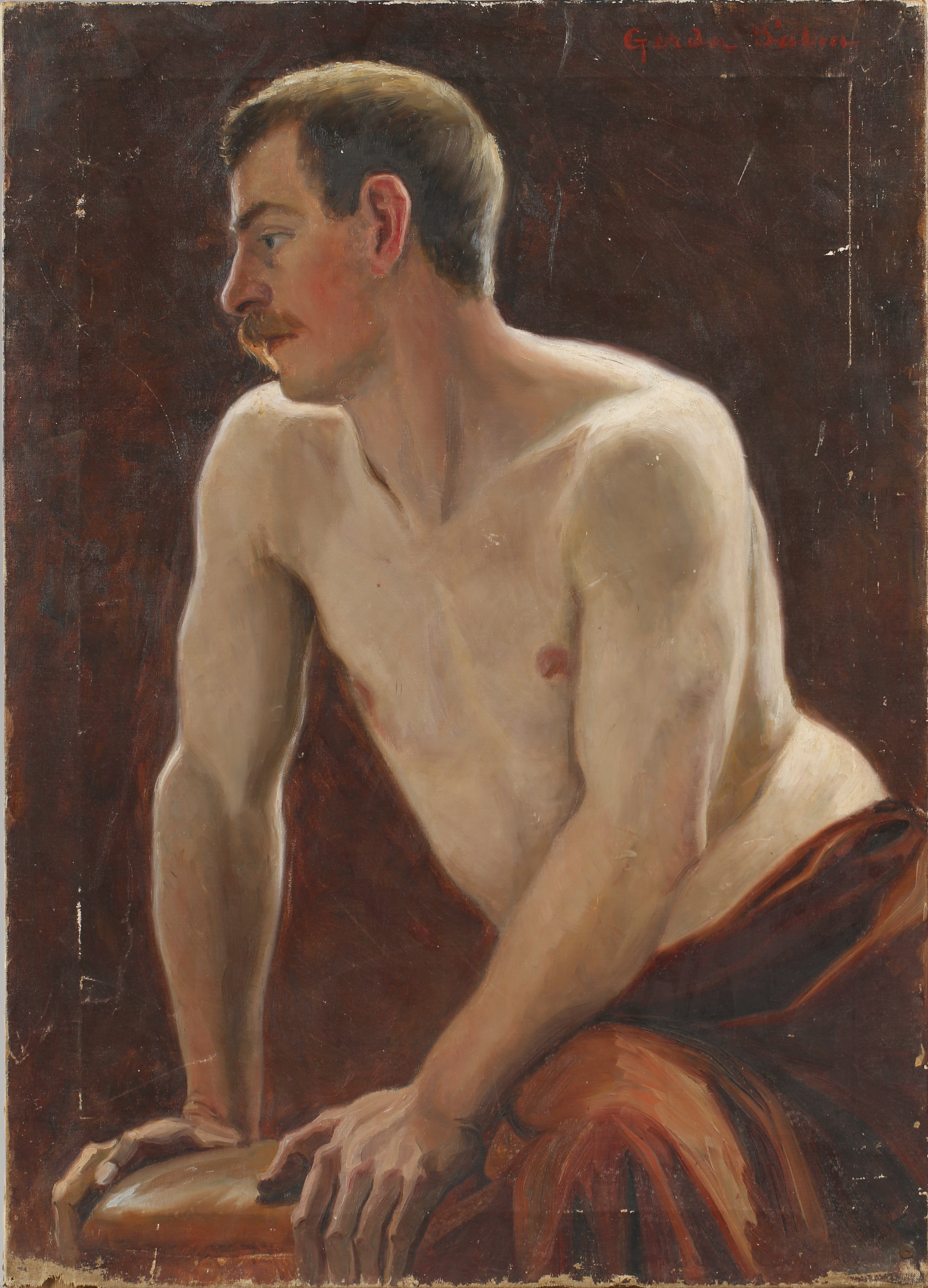
Nude

She studied art in Stockholm at the Academy of Fine Arts from 1895 to 1901 before travelling to Munich, Paris and Rome afterwards She painted portraits and landscapes. She studied at Axel Tallberg's school in 1912. Separately, she exhibited at the Lilla ateljén in Stockholm in 1941 and at Good Art in Gothenburg in 1945. She participated in the Lund exhibition in 1907 and the Swedish Artists ' Association's exhibition at the Skåne Art Museum in Lund in 1912 and the International Madonna exhibition in Florence in 1933.

She successfully entered Dalsland Art Association exhibitions in the 1930s and 40s. She had work in the Hesselboms exhibition in 1938.

Palm died in Gothenburg in 1949. Her paintings are in Vanersborg Museum, the Gothenburg Art Museum, Alingsås and Uddevalla Museum, and in Dalsland.

== Sources ==
- Swedish artist lexicon part IV page 350, Allhems Förlag, Malmö. LIBRIS-ID: 8390296
- Swedish artists, Biographical handbook, Väbo publishing company, 1987, pages 407-408 ISBN 91-87504-00-6
