= Gerda Hellberg =

Swedish women's rights activist (1870–1937)

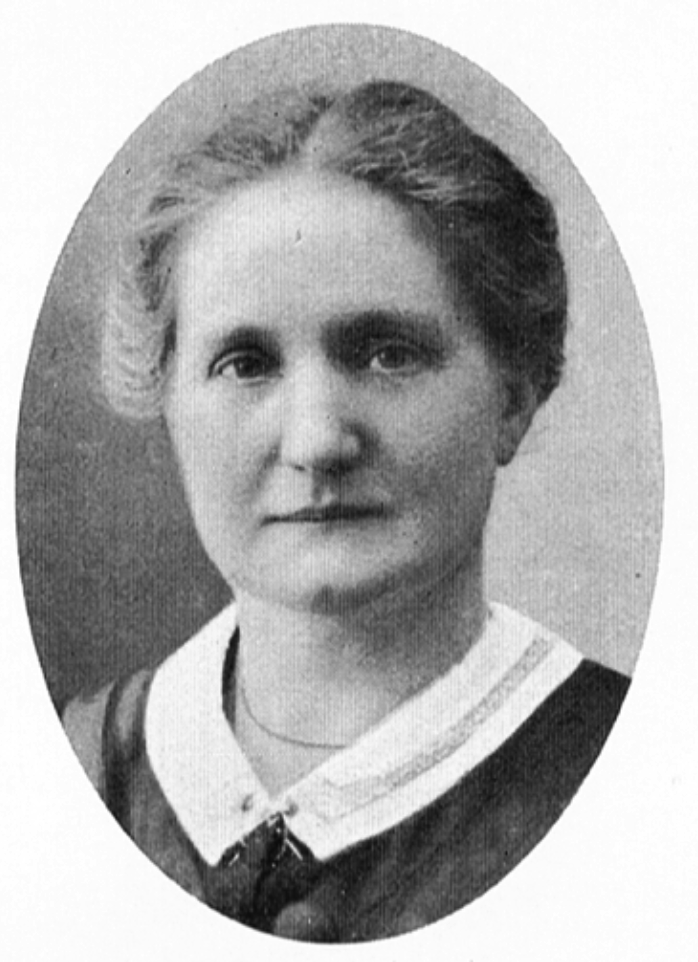
Gerta Hellberg (1920)

Gerda Hellberg (née Lundberg; 22 June 1870 – 6 August 1937) was a prominent Swedish women's rights activist, contributing to Sweden's fight for women's suffrage. While studying in Uppsala, together with her female student friends, she founded Sweden's first student association for women. After moving to Karlstad in 1897, her home became a centre for meetings of women's rights activists. In 1903, she established the Karlstad branch of the National Association for Women's Suffrage (LKPR) and in 1912 was the first women to be elected to the city council. Following the introduction of women's suffrage, she chaired the newly established Karlstad branch of the Fredrika Bremer Association, the oldest existing women's rights organization in Sweden.

== Early life and education ==
Born in Stockholm on 22 June 1870, Gerda Lundberg was the daughter of the merchant and industrialist Olof Henrik Lundberg and his wife Ida Josefina née Lundgren. She was raised in a well-to-do home with six half-siblings from her mother's first marriage. After attending Stockholm's French school until 1886, she studied German and biology at Norra Latin, continuing at Wallinska skolan. She began studying languages at Uppsala University in 1888, the only woman among almost a thousand students. She graduated in modern languages in 1892.

While studying in Uppsala, she lived with Ann-Margret Holmgren and her family in a home attracting liberal radicals. She established friendships with two other borders, Gulli Petrini and Lydia Wahlström, the latter becoming a lifelong companion. Together with a few other women, Gerda Lundberg encouraged them to establish Sweden's first student association for women, Kvinnliga Studentföreningen, founded on 2 March 1892.

== Suffrage and women's rights ==
The same year, she met Mauritz Hellberg (1859–1947) from the radical Verdandi student association. The editor of the daily newspaper Karlstads-Tidninger, he also stood for universal suffrage. The couple married in 1897 on Gerda's 27th birthday. They settled in Karlstad where their first son, Helvin, was born two years later. Their second son, Love, born in 1903 but died the following year.

In March 1903, as a result of increasing interest in votes for women, the Karlstad branch of LKPR, the women's association for suffrage, was established. With Gerda Hellstad as chair, the organization was one of the two most active branches in western Sweden, the other being the Gothenburg branch. The family also moved into a new residence, Villa Skogsbrynet, large enough to attract a stream of visitors interested in the suffrage movement.

In November 1912, thanks to support from the women's association, Hellberg was elected to the city council where she served until 1923. That year, a branch of Fredrika Bremer Association was established in Karlstad with Hellberg as chair. She worked towards better professional qualifications for women and for general equality. She served until 1935 when she became honorary chair.

Gerda Hellberg died in Karlstad on 6 August 1937.
