= Gerde =

Gerde may refer to:

== People ==
- Oszkár Gerde (1883-1944), Hungarian 2x Olympic champion sabre fencer

== Places ==
- Gerde, Hautes-Pyrénées, commune in the Hautes-Pyrénées department, France
- Gerde, Hungary, village in the Baranya county, Hungary
