= Gulli Petrini =

Swedish physicist and suffragist (1867–1941)

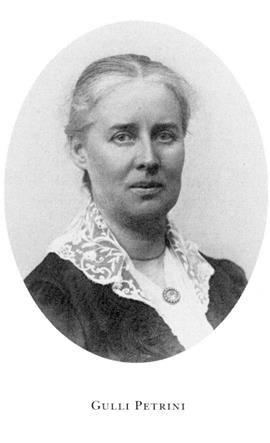
- Born: 30 September 1867; Stockholm, Sweden
- Died: 8 April 1941 (aged 73); Stockholm, Sweden
- Education: Uppsala University
- Occupations: Author, Physicist, Politician, Suffragette
- Spouse: Henrik Petrini (m. 1902)

Gulli Charlotta Petrini (Stockholm, 30 September 1867 – Stockholm, 8 April 1941) was a Swedish Physicist, writer, suffragette, women's rights activist and politician. She was the chairperson of the local branch of the National Association for Women's Suffrage in Växjö 1903–1914 and Stockholm 1914–1921, and sat in the city council for the liberals in Växjö in 1910–1914.

== Biography ==
She was born on 30 September 1867 to professor Carl Jacob Rossander and Emma Maria Godenius. She graduated at the Wallinska skolan in 1887, and became Doctor of Philosophy at Uppsala University in 1901. In 1902, she married fellow student Henrik Petrini. She worked as a teacher at the secondary education school for females in Växjö in 1902–06, and as a teacher at different girls' schools in Stockholm in 1914–1931.

Gulli Petrini became interested in the women's movement as a student in Uppsala in the 1890s, where she frequented the radical circle around Ann-Margret Holmgren. Her interest in the women's movement was inspired by her own life, which was not conventional. Supported by her progressive father, she studied at university when this was still a controversial thing for a female; she was also a professional despite being married in a period when married females were not expected to support themselves. She became active within politics in 1904, when she became engaged in the local branch of the suffrage movement in Växjö, and soon became a prominent figure in the Swedish women suffrage movement.

Petrini died on 8 April 1941.

== Sources ==
- Barbro Hedvall (2011). Susanna Eriksson Lundqvist. red.. Vår rättmätiga plats. Om kvinnornas kamp för rösträtt.. Förlag Bonnier. ISBN 978-91-7424-119-8
- Gulli C Petrini, urn:sbl:7193, Svenskt biografiskt lexikon (art av Hjördis Levin), hämtad 2015-09-05.
