= Gerda Laski =

Austrian/German physicist

- Born: 4 June 1893; Vienna
- Died: 24 November 1928 (aged 35); Berlin
- Education: University of Vienna
- Scientific career
- Fields: Physics
- Workplaces: Kaiser Wilhelm Society; Physikalisch-Technische Bundesanstalt
- Thesis: Size Determination of Submicroscopic Particles Based on Optical and Mechanical Effects (1917)

Gerda Laski (4 June 1893, Vienna – 24 November 1928, Berlin) was an Austrian/German physicist known for her research in infrared radiation. She went to a private girls secondary grammar school in Vienna and graduated in 1913.

She earned her doctorate in physics from the University of Vienna in 1917 on "Size Determination of Submicroscopic Particles Based on Optical and Mechanical Effects". From 1918 to 1919, she worked as an assistant at the University of Göttingen and, in 1920, as an assistant at the Physical Institute of the Technische Hochschule in Charlottenburg (now Technische Universität Berlin), where she was introduced to the experimental technique that became her major interest.

Her early research concerned extensions of the Bohr model of hydrogen atoms to hydrogen molecules. Laski was a student of Peter Debye, who was awarded the Nobel Prize in chemistry in 1936. Debye studied the dispersion of light using Bohr's hydrogen model and found that the theoretical curve corresponded satisfactorily to the curve observed. Laski later showed agreement between theory and experiment, however based on an erroneous interpretation of data.

Laski's main research focus later on was infrared research. This included the examination of selected chemical substances by means of infrared radiation—a field of application. Beginning in 1924, Laski was the director of the Infrared Department at the Institute for Fibre Chemistry of the Kaiser Wilhelm Society. This department was closed due to lack of financing. She then became a voluntary assistant at the Physikalisch-Technische Bundesanstalt (Imperial Physical-Technical Institute) in 1927, in order to establish an infrared laboratory.

After serious illness, the Kaiser Wilhelm Institute for Physics provided Laski with a monthly stipend until her death in 1928.

Her final work was on special methods for infrared measurement and thermoelectricity. Her research also included studying natural infrared frequencies of diatomic Bohr gas molecules and their specific heat at high temperatures.

== Literature ==
Laski wrote her thesis on "Size Determination of Submicroscopic Particles Based on Optical and Mechanical Effects", which was published in 1917 and is 48 pages long. The book is written in German and is part of the holdings of the German National Library.
