= Michelle Jaffé =

American artist

- Known for: Visual Art
- Notable work: Wappen Field (2003 - 2015); Soul Junk (2013-2019); Murmur/Mutter/Yell (2019-2021); LocaleS3 (2023); GRIFTER's Gambit (2025)
- Movement: Sound art, New media art, Installation art

Michelle Jaffé is an American intermedia artist, known for her immersive participatory installations combining sculpture, sound, and performative video. Symbols, forms, and concepts in her work are often influenced by political, spiritual, and psychological themes. Prior to her career as an artist, Jaffé was notable in the New York City fashion scene for her hat and accessory designs.

== Early life and education ==
Jaffé lived and was educated in Europe from ages fourteen to twenty-three. Her paternal grandparents lived in Shanghai and childhood exposure to both traditional Chinese and Japanese art had a significant influence on her visual sensibility and artistic development.

In 1979, Jaffé earned a BA Honors in Fine Arts and French literature at the University of East Anglia in Norwich, England. She studied stone carving at the Sculpture Center School in 1991, sculpture at the New York Studio School in 1992, and sound at Harvestworks Digital Media in 2002, and Jewelry Design at Fashion Institute of Technology in New York in 1995.

== Artwork ==
Jaffé's mature body of work combines sculpture, sound and vocal compositions, and video within installations that prompt active listening. Her formative sculptures made from steel, aluminum, and other malleable materials, resemble shapes and forms that evoke armor, such as breastplates, chastity belts, and medieval codpieces. Her “Vestment Series” (2000-2007) of metal sculptures envision clothing as a form of both physical and psychological shelter. Regarding two particular sculptures from the series, Breastplate (2002) and Preying Mantis (2002), Olivia Kohler-Maga, Assistant Director of the Luther W. Brady Art Gallery at George Washington University, observed that, “In Breastplate, she takes a piece of armor—something that is meant to protect you—and it becomes almost delicate and airy, floating off the wall. In case you think the work isn't fit for battle, the back edges are fitted with menacing, serrated edges. The piece next to it, Preying Mantis, takes the forms a step further, likening it to an insect known for its attack.”

Around the year 2000, Jaffé started exploring sound alongside her sculptural works. Some of her notable audiovisual works include Wappen Field, exhibited at Urban Institute for Contemporary Arts in Grand Rapids, Michigan in 2011; Bosi Contemporary gallery in New York in 2012; Beall Center for Art +Technology at UC Irvine in 2013; Transylvania University in Lexington, Kentucky in 2015; New Media Gallery in New Westminster, Canada in 2017, and Soul Junk, exhibited at Milton Art Bank in Milton, Pennsylvania in 2017; White Box in New York City in 2019; Murmur/Mutter/Yell exhibited at 11 Rivington, New York in 2021; and GRIFTER's Gambit exhibited at NYU Audio Lab at 370 Media Commons, Brooklyn in 2025.

Wappen Field (2003 - 2015) is a twenty-seven minute abstract vocal composition utilizing SuperCollider programming. The recording is played through twelve chrome plated steel helmets to create an enveloping sonic installation that moves throughout each helmet. Jaffé has stated that the installation is intended to prompt participants to contemplate “what we, as human beings, share in common instead of focusing on what divides us.” Art historian Stephanie Buhmann notes that while everyone who experiences Wappen Field is enveloped by a separate mask and a unique component of the vocal composition, it also “guarantees a sharable endeavor” because viewers must interact with each helmet to hear the complete composition. When Wappen Field was exhibited in 2011 as part of a group exhibition at the Urban Institute for Contemporary Arts in Grand Rapids, Michigan, art critic Joseph Becherer noted that it was “Among the most sophisticated in terms of concept and form.” Wappen Field was also featured in the exhibition Behind the Mask at Culture Lab LIC, in Queens, New York in 2024.

Soul Junk (2013 - 2019) is a twenty-eight minute, three-channel video and sound installation, presenting a female stream of conscious narrative juxtaposing personal trauma with observations about abuses of power throughout society.

Murmur / Mutter / Yell ( 2019-2021) is a sound and light installation using Wave Field Synthesis speakers to sculpt the thirty-five-minute vocal composition in a three-dimensional space. The libretto explores the implications of private data that is mined from an online user agreeing to a website or application’s conditions and terms.

LocaleS3 (2023) is a collaborative project using sound as a kinetic plastic material for making sculpture. In 2022, Jaffé, along with Phil Edelstein and David Reeder began working series of projects that share interests in composing, the physical and dimensional properties of sound, and software. The first, titled LocaleS3 premiered during Harvestworks 2023 Art and Technology Program on Governor's Island. It consists of a series of immersive compositions arranged in site-specific locations within a house that are discoverable by visitors.

GRIFTER's Gambit (2023) is an immersive interdisciplinary installation, with a visual narrative that is affixed to a vocal score composed by Jaffé, which she describes as a "tragicomic opera." GRIFTER's Gambit addresses themes of toxic masculinity, the effects of patriarchal hegemony, and power shifts in American political life and discourse. Jaffé states that, "GRIFTER’s Gambit is rooted in the personal, the archetype of the narcissistic authoritarian alpha personality, a very insecure type." The installation was exhibited in 2025 at NYU Audio Lab at 370 Media Commons, Brooklyn.

== Exhibitions, residencies, and collections ==
Jaffé's art has been exhibited in galleries, museums, university art galleries, and non-profit art spaces, including Sight & Sound at the Beall Center for Art + Technology, UC Irvine, California alongside artists and composers Lewis De Soto, Paul DeMarinis, Ed Osborn, and George LeGrady; Culture Lab LIC, New York City; Urban Institute for Contemporary Arts, Grand Rapids, Michigan; Milton Art Bank, Milton PA; White Box, New York, NY; Voicing at New Media Gallery in New Westminster with artists Marcus Coates and Martin Backes; George Washington University’s Luther W. Brady Gallery; The Power Plant at Duke University; and Morlan Gallery at Transylvania University.

Jaffé has been an artist in residence at the MacDowell Colony in Peterborough, New Hampshire and Djerassi Artist Residencies in Woodside, California. She has been selected for the Fiscal Sponsorship program through the New York Foundation for the Arts (NYFA) in 2008 for her project Wappen Field, in 2013 with her work Neural, in 2020 for Murmur/Mutter/Yell, and again in 2023 for GRIFTER’s Gambit.

Her visual art is in the collection of the Listasafn Islands National Gallery of Iceland, and her accessories design work is in the Philadelphia Museum of Art, Museum at Fashion Institute of Technology and Palais Galliera - Musée de la Mode de la Ville de Paris.
