= Gerda Kordemets =

Estonian theatre and film director (born 1960)

- Born: Gerda Kulli-Kordemets; 25 June 1960 (age 66); Tallinn, then part of Estonian SSR, Soviet Union
- Other name: Gerda Raud
- Education: Tallinn Pedagogical Institute
- Occupations: Director; playwright; theatre critic; culture journalist
- Years active: 1985–present

Gerda Kordemets (born Gerda Kulli-Kordemets, until 1982 Raud; born 25 June 1960) is an Estonian theatre and film director, playwright, theatre critic, and culture journalist.

She was born in Tallinn, Estonian SSR. In 1986 she graduated from Tallinn Pedagogical Institute in stage managing speciality. From 1985 to 1993 she worked at Eesti Televisioon, being at several offices. From 1995 to 1996 she was the executive editor of the newspaper Pühapäevaleht and worked as a cultural journalist for Päevaleht, Eesti Päevaleht and Sõnumileht. From 1998 to 2011 she was the chief editor of Eesti Televisioon's cultural programs. Since 2011 she is a freelancer.

== Filmography ==
- 2007: Klass (feature film; II director)
- 2008: Klass: elu pärast (television series; producer, director, scenarist)
- 2012: Alpimaja (television series; director)
- 2012: Süvahavva
- 2019: Mehed
