= Gerda Krüger-Nieland =

German lawyer and judge (1910–2000)

Personal details
- Born: 22 June 1910 Bremen
- Died: 21 September 2000 (aged 90) Karlsruhe

Gerda Krüger-Nieland (June 22, 1910, in Bremen – September 21, 2000, in Karlsruhe) was a German lawyer and first senate president at the Federal Court of Justice.

Because of some restrictions, she was not allowed to work as a judge or a lawyer and in 1945, fled to Hamburg and worked there as a lawyer and mainly as a defense lawyer.

Although she had never worked as a judge before, she became a judge in 1951 at the newly established Federal Court of Justice. In 1965, she was appointed as the first woman to the Senate President of the I. Civil Senate of this court,
