= Gerda Nettesheim =

German sound artist

- Born: 1947
- Died: 2011 (aged 63–64)
- Known for: Sound art

Gerda Nettesheim (1947–2011) was a German Sound artist. She studied flute and piano at the School of Music in Cologne. Her professional career began at the end of the 1970s and her first exhibitions were in 1981. Nettesheim's first exhibition took place shortly after the completion of her studies in 1981. This exhibition was organized by the Siegen Art Society, located in a small town near Bonn (in Villa). It was developed in collaboration with her husband, the sculptor Peter Nettesheim, and the art department of the University of Siegen.
