= Sweden–Israel Friendship Association =

The Sweden–Israel Friendship Association (Swedish: Vänskapsförbundet Sverige-Israel) is a Sweden-based organization which describes its purpose as to "establish and increase knowledge about – and the understanding of – Israel in Sweden, and in different ways work to strengthen Swedish–Israeli bonds of friendship."

The Sweden–Israel Friendship Association established its first local branch in Stockholm in 1953. The founding was marked with an appeal written by Hugo Valentin, Swedish historian, in the Riksdag building on May 8. In 1954 local branches were also established in Gothenburg and Malmö. The nationwide association was established in 1978.

The association currently comprises 26 local branches with about 3,000 members. The current chairman of the association is Lars Adaktusson — member of the Riksdag for the Christian Democrats.

== See also ==
- Foreign relations of Israel
- Foreign relations of Sweden
- International recognition of Israel
- Israel–Sweden relations
