= Paul Beaver =

- Born: Paul Henry Beaver Jr. August 14, 1925; Columbiana, Ohio, U.S.
- Died: January 16, 1975 (aged 49) Los Angeles, California, US
- Genres: Experimental, electronic music, psychedelic rock, jazz
- Occupation: Musician
- Instruments: Organ, Moog synthesizer
- Years active: 1945–1975
- Labels: Elektra, Warner Bros.
- Formerly of: Beaver & Krause

Paul Henry Beaver Jr. (August 14, 1925 – January 16, 1975) was an American musician who was a pioneer in popular electronic music, using the Moog synthesizer. From 1967, Beaver collaborated with Bernie Krause as the recording duo Beaver & Krause.

== Early life and career ==
Born in Columbiana, Ohio, Paul Beaver studied classical music and learned the organ, before acquiring technical knowledge of electronics while serving in the US Navy in World War II. After the war, he played the organ at the Angelus Temple in Los Angeles, made music and special effects for movies such as The Magnetic Monster (1953), and became a technical consultant to the Hammond Organ Company. He also became a successful session musician, had his own recording studio, and rented out musical instruments from his collection.

== Work with Bernie Krause ==
Beaver was the electronic half of a 1967 experimental free-form album for Dunhill Records with studio drummer Hal Blaine called Psychedelic Percussion. In 1966, he was approached by Jac Holzman of Elektra Records, who wished to make an album that used electronic music in a format that would appeal to the emerging hippie culture. Holzman introduced Beaver to Bernie Krause, another synthesizer enthusiast. They decided to pool their savings to buy a Moog synthesizer, and agreed to work together on the project, alongside composer and arranger Mort Garson. The result was the album The Zodiac: Cosmic Sounds.

They continued to work together in a project to master the new Moog synthesizer and present it as a viable instrument for film and recording work. From 1967, Beaver collaborated with Krause as the recording duo Beaver & Krause. They were one of the first groups to record pop-commercial electronic music, which later became known as electronica. Their double album The Nonesuch Guide to Electronic Music, issued on Jac Holzman's Nonesuch record label, was a landmark work, introducing the public to the full range of individual sounds that the Moog could make, and in great detail.

As Robert Moog's sales representatives on the U.S. West Coast, they attracted limited industry interest until the Monterey Pop Festival in June 1967, when musicians and artists' representatives visited their stall and began placing orders for Moogs. Over the next two years, Beaver played a key role in popularizing the instrument in rock music and in film and television. During that time, he undertook a steady stream of session work for their Moog customers and led workshops attended by film composers and session keyboardists.

Among his many appearances on recordings by pop and rock acts, Beaver played the Moog on The Monkees' song "Star Collector", the final song on their fourth album Pisces, Aquarius, Capricorn & Jones Ltd., released in November 1967, and on The Byrds' "Goin' Back", from their 1968 album The Notorious Byrd Brothers. He also contributed to the Elektra Records 1966 release The Zodiac: Cosmic Sounds, an album that is widely recognised as the first recording in the genre to feature the Moog synthesizer.

Beaver was a friend and associate of George Martin, and he aided in the production of The Beatles' Magical Mystery Tour album, supplying the first-generation Hammond B3 organ which provided the strange sound effect at the end of "Blue Jay Way" (accomplished by switching the motorized 'tone wheel' off and on). During this time he and musician-engineer Phil Davis built a custom polyphonic Moog modular synthesizer, based on the Moog Apollo prototype, for Keith Emerson of Emerson, Lake & Palmer that was one of the first electronic instruments to have programmable preset sounds, controlled by an auxiliary 8-bit computer which used a TV monitor. In addition, Beaver, together with associates Phil Davis and Dan Wyman, worked alongside composer Alexander Courage, composing and performing incidental ambient music ("The Cage" and others) and creating several sound effects for the original Star Trek television series.

Beaver & Krause continued releasing electronic albums, first for Mercury Records' spin-off label, Limelight, with their album Ragnarok (1969), then three albums for Warner Bros. Records: In a Wild Sanctuary (1970), Gandharva (1971), and All Good Men (1972). Combining the Moog with acoustic instruments, these albums are key early documents of the "New Age" musical movement. The ending of the track "Spaced", from the Wild Sanctuary album, which features two synthesizers simultaneously gliding up and down to merge into a final single chord, was later re-performed to become the musical soundtrack for the original THX logo used in movie theatres. With Ruth White, Beaver established the Electronic Music Association in the 1970s.

== Personal life and death ==
Beaver was a Scientologist, a right-wing Republican, unmarried, and a bisexual proponent of sexual liberation. His health began to deteriorate in 1973. He died of a cerebral aneurysm in January 1975, at the age of 49, while working on a revised version of The Nonesuch Guide.

== Legacy ==
Writing on his website Head Heritage (under his pseudonym "the Seth Man"), musician and musicologist Julian Cope describes Beaver as "one of the first and most unique American synthesizer players". Tom Oberheim said of Beaver that "other than Carlos, [he was] probably the person most responsible for getting the synthesizer thing going."

== Discography ==
With Beaver & Krause

- The Nonesuch Guide To Electronic Music (Nonesuch, 1968)
- Ragnarok (Limelight, 1969)
- In A Wild Sanctuary (Warner Bros., 1970)
- Gandharva (Warner Bros., 1971)
- All Good Men (Warner Bros., 1972)

With Les Baxter

- Moog Rock (GNP Crescendo, 1969)

With The Beach Boys

- Sunflower (Brother/Reprise, 1970)

With Hal Blaine

- Psychedelic Percussion (Dunhill, 1967)

With The Byrds

- The Notorious Byrd Brothers (Columbia, 1968)

With Cold Blood

- First Taste of Sin (Reprise, 1972)

With Spade Cooley

- Fidoodlin' (Raynote, 1959)

With Neil Diamond

- Jonathan Livingston Seagull (Original Motion Picture Soundtrack) (Columbia, 1973)

With Modesto Duran

- Fabulous Rhythms Of Modesto (Raynote, 1960)

With The Electric Flag

- The Trip (Original Motion Picture Soundtrack) (Sidewalk, 1967)
- A Long Time Comin' (Columbia, 1968)

With Donald Erb

- Music For Instruments & Electronic Sounds (Nonesuch, 1969)

With Don Everly

- Don Everly (Ode, 1971)

With James William Guercio

- Electra Glide in Blue (Original Motion Picture Soundtrack) (United Artists, 1973)

With LaMont Johnson

- Nine: A Musical Mystical Allegory (Orchard, 1976)

With Quincy Jones

- Smackwater Jack (A&M, 1971)
- Dollars (Reprise, 1972)
- I Heard That!! (A&M, 1976)

With Roger Kellaway

- Spirit Feel (Liberty, 1967)

With Gail Laughton

- Harps of the Ancient Temples (Rapture, 1969)

With Jackie Lomax

- Is This What You Want? (Apple, 1969)

With Mike Melvoin

- The Plastic Cow Goes Moooooog (Dot, 1969)

With The Monkees

- Pisces, Aquarius, Capricorn & Jones Ltd. (Colgems, 1967)

With Hugo Montenegro

- Moog Power (RCA, 1968)

With The Mystic Moods Orchestra

- Emotions (Philips, 1968)
- Extensions (Philips, 1969)

With Emil Richards

- New Sound Element Stones (Uni, 1967)
- New Time Element (Uni, 1967)

With Leonard Rosenman

- Beneath the Planet of the Apes (Original Motion Picture Soundtrack) (20th Century Fox, 1970)

With Salvation

- Gypsy Carnival Caravan (ABC, 1968)

With Lalo Schifrin

- Music from Mission: Impossible (Dot, 1967)
- There's a Whole Lalo Schifrin Goin' On (Dot, 1968)

With Ravi Shankar

- Shankar Family & Friends (Dark Horse, 1974)

With Skylark

- Skylark (Capitol, 1972)

With The Sound Of Feeling

- Spleen (Limelight, 1968)

With Styx

- The Serpent Is Rising (Wooden Nickel, 1973)

With Mason Williams

- The Mason Williams Ear Show (Warner Bros., 1968)

With The Zeet Band

- Moogie Woogie (Chess, 1970)

With no album artist name

- The Zodiac: Cosmic Sounds (Elektra, 1967)
- Unplayed by Human Hands (Creative Record Service, 1975)
- Unplayed by Human Hands (Computer Humanities, 1976)
