= David Fricke =

American music journalist (born c. 1951)

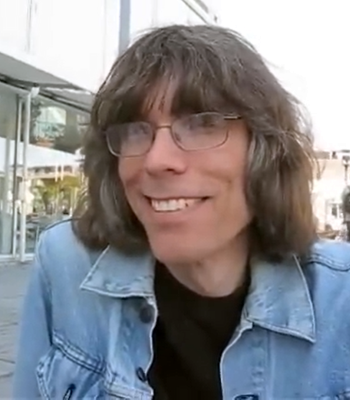
- Fricke in 2008
- Born: 1951 or 1952 (age 73–74)
- Education: Muhlenberg College
- Occupations: Journalist; editor
- Employer: Rolling Stone

David Fricke (born 1951 or 1952) is an American music journalist who serves as the senior editor at Rolling Stone magazine, where he writes predominantly about rock music. One of the best known names in rock journalism, his career has spanned over 40 years. In the 1990s, he was the magazine's music editor before stepping down.

== Early life and education ==
Fricke graduated from Muhlenberg College in Allentown, Pennsylvania, in 1973, where he was a DJ at the campus station, WMUH.

== Career ==
The first concert that Fricke attended was a show by Pink Floyd. His love of live music inspired him to pursue a career in music journalism. He has recalled meeting George Harrison at a promotional event in Washington, DC for the former Beatle's Thirty Three & 1/3 album, as a particularly "remarkable moment", saying, "it changed the way I listened to his music ... I had spoken to the man, not the History."

Before joining Rolling Stone, where he became senior editor, he wrote for Circus, Trouser Press, Synapse and Good Times. He has since written for Melody Maker, Mojo, and JazzTimes.

Fricke has been nominated for a Grammy Award for his album liner notes and is a three-time winner of the ASCAP-Deems Taylor Award for excellence in music journalism. He has appeared on the Classic Albums documentaries on the making of Pink Floyd's The Dark Side of the Moon, Cream's Disraeli Gears, Def Leppard's Hysteria, Nirvana's Nevermind, Metallica's Black Album, Peter Gabriel's So, Frank Zappa's Apostrophe and Over-Nite Sensation as well as Rush's Moving Pictures and 2112 albums. Fricke has also appeared on a number of Lou Reed documentaries and in the Wilco documentary I Am Trying to Break Your Heart.

The Domino Recording Company released the North American version of the 30th anniversary reissue of Aztec Camera's debut album, High Land, Hard Rain in 2014 with liner notes written by Fricke.

As of 2013, he was creator of the "Fricke's Picks Radio" podcast and the Alternate Take blog in Rolling Stone as well as serving as the Host of the Friday Night Affair on “Tom Petty Radio”. He is currently a DJ at Sirius XM Radio.

== Bibliography ==
=== Essays and reporting ===
- Fricke, David (May 2015). "Rhiannon Giddens' old-time religion". Rolling Stone (Australia). 762: 24.

=== Album reviews ===
Album title	Artist	Reviewed in
Dungeon Golds	The Minus 5	Fricke, David (May 2015). "[Untitled review]". Reviews. Rolling Stone (Australia). 762: 95.
Policy	Butler, Will	Fricke, David (May 2015). "[Untitled review]". Reviews. Rolling Stone (Australia). 762: 98.

=== Liner notes ===
Fricke has written liner notes for a number of albums, compilations and box sets, including:

- The 1979 Kevin Roth album New Wind
- The 1993 Moby Grape compilation Vintage: The Very Best of Moby Grape
- The 1993 John Prine compilation Great Days: The John Prine Anthology
- The 1993 Led Zeppelin compilation Led Zeppelin Boxed Set 2
- The 1994 Hüsker Dü live album The Living End
- The 1995 Velvet Underground box set Peel Slowly and See; the 1997 "Fully Loaded" reissue of Loaded
- The Byrds 1996–2000 CD reissue series
- The 1997 Simon & Garfunkel compilation Old Friends
- The 1997 Paul Kelly compilation Songs from the South
- The 1998 Metallica covers compilation Garage Inc.
- The 1998 Long Ryders 2-CD compilation Anthology
- The 1999 Captain Beefheart box set Grow Fins: Rarities 1965–1982
- The 1999 Jimi Hendrix live compilation Live at Woodstock
- The 1999 Ramones compilation Hey! Ho! Let's Go: The Anthology
- The 2002 Nirvana "best-of" compilation Nirvana
- The 2003 AC/DC Back in Black reissue Back in Black (remaster)
- The 2004 George Harrison box set The Dark Horse Years 1976–1992
- The 2005 Violent Femmes "best of" compilation Permanent Record: The Very Best of Violent Femmes; the 2024 box set Violent Femmes
- The 2006 Def Leppard 20th Anniversary Hysteria "Deluxe Edition"
- The 2006 Frank Zappa box set The MOFO Project/Object
- The 2007 The Church "best of" compilation Deep in the Shallows
- The 2007 Led Zeppelin "best of" compilation Mothership
- The 2008 Billy Joel box set The Stranger 30th Anniversary Edition
- The 2009 Frank Zappa box set Lumpy Money
- The 2009 Grateful Dead box set Winterland June 1977: The Complete Recordings
- The 2013 The Numbers Band (a.k.a. 15–60–75) reissue Jimmy Bell's Still In Town (1975)
