= Mother Earth's Plantasia =

Studio album by Mort Garson
- Released: 1976
- Studios: Patchcord Productions, Hollywood, California
- Genre: Space age pop
- Length: 30:55
- Labels: Homewood Records, Sacred Bones

Professional ratings
Aggregate scores
| Source | Rating |
|---|---|
| Metacritic | 78/100 |
Review scores
| Source | Rating |
| AllMusic | 4.5/5 stars |
| Pitchfork | 7.2/10 |
| The Quietus | 5/5 stars |

Mother Earth's Plantasia is an electronic album by Mort Garson released in 1976.

== Background ==
The "Mother Earth" in the album's title refers to Lynn and Joel Rapp, a couple of fern correspondents who had authored plant care books and were friends of composer Mort Garson. The music on this album was composed specifically for plants to listen to. Garson was inspired by his wife, who grew many plants in their home. Garson used a Moog synthesizer to compose the album, the first album from the West Coast of the United States to be composed entirely on the Moog synthesizer.

The album had a very limited distribution upon release, only being available to people who bought a houseplant from a store called Mother Earth on Melrose Avenue in Los Angeles or those who purchased a Simmons mattress from a Sears outlet, both of which came with the record. As a result, the album failed to attain widespread popularity around the time of its release. However, it has since gained a cult following as an early work of electronic music.

== Legacy ==
The album also gained popularity on YouTube, with the full album (uploaded without permission) gaining millions of views and thousands of comments spread over multiple different bootleg uploads.

A cover of "Plantasia" was produced by Griffin McElroy for use in a 2017 episode of The Adventure Zone.

In March 2019, Sacred Bones Records announced that they were officially reissuing Mother Earth's Plantasia. The reissue is available on music streaming services and was released on vinyl, CD and cassette on June 21, 2019. The former included a card for a digital download of the album, pressed with wildflowers that could be planted and grown, as well as a booklet filled with poems and anecdotes about the Mother Earth shop. Angie Martoccio, writing for Rolling Stone in 2019, described Mother Earth's Plantasia as Garson's magnum opus. Stephen M. Deusner, writing for Pitchfork, described it as perhaps Garson's "most beloved album, at least among crate-diggers and record collectors."

For the 2023 tax season, Intuit used the opening track "Plantasia" on a TurboTax advertisement.

In France from 2023, supermarket chain giant Intermarché used the same track in a long-running TV advert for their "10 per cent" sales campaign.

The album was shortlisted for the Polaris Heritage Prize at the 2025 Polaris Music Prize.

== Track listing ==
Side one
| No. | Title | Length |
|---|---|---|
| 1. | "Plantasia" | 3:21 |
| 2. | "Symphony for a Spider Plant" | 2:41 |
| 3. | "Baby's Tears Blues" | 3:03 |
| 4. | "Ode to an African Violet" | 4:03 |
| 5. | "Concerto for Philodendron & Pothos" | 3:09 |

Side two
| No. | Title | Length |
|---|---|---|
| 6. | "Rhapsody in Green" | 3:28 |
| 7. | "Swingin' Spathiphyllums" | 2:59 |
| 8. | "You Don't Have to Walk a Begonia" | 2:31 |
| 9. | "A Mellow Mood for Maidenhair" | 2:17 |
| 10. | "Music to Soothe the Savage Snake Plant" | 3:23 |

== Personnel ==
- Mort Garson – score, electronics
- Eugene L. Hamblin III – electronic engineering
- Sam Nicholson – art direction
- Marvin Rubin – illustrations

== Charts ==
| Chart (2019) | Peak position |
|---|---|
| US Independent Albums (Billboard) | 6 |
| US Top Dance/Electronic Albums (Billboard) | 8 |

== See also ==
- Stevie Wonder's Journey Through "The Secret Life of Plants", 1979 album by Stevie Wonder
- Plant perception (physiology)
