= The Wozard of Iz =

1968 album by Mort Garson

Studio album by Mort Garson
- Released: 1968
- Studio: EmGee Electronic Studio
- Genres: Electronic, spoken word, psychedelic
- Length: 35:05
- Label: A&M
- Producer: Bernard Krause

Mort Garson chronology
The Zodiac: Cosmic Sounds (1967)	The Wozard of Iz (1968)	Black Mass Lucifer (1971)

The Wozard of Iz (also known as The Wozard of Iz: An Electronic Odyssey) is a 1968 album of electronic music composed and realized by Mort Garson and conceived and written by Jacques Wilson. It psychedelically parodies the 1939 film The Wizard of Oz, setting the characters in the 1960s with a hippie mindset. Throughout the story the main character, Dorothy, seeks out "where it's at".

The album was released the year following another collaboration between Garson and Wilson, The Zodiac: Cosmic Sounds, a concept album issued by Elektra Records.

== Production ==
In a 1969 interview, Garson admitted that he hadn't used the Moog synthesizer in "a very sophisticated way" for his 1967 album, The Zodiac: Cosmic Sounds. However, by the time of The Wozard of Iz, he had learned most of the techniques for using the instrument.

== Cast of characters ==
- Dorothy - Suzie Jane Hokom (Note: Contrary to popular legend, Suzi(e) Jane Hokom is not a pseudonym for Nancy Sinatra.)
- Scared Crow - Barney Phillips
- In-man - Jay Jasin
- Lyin' Coward - Barney Phillips
- Baddy Witch - Julie Haas
- Goodie Witch - Jadine Vaughn
- Narrator - Jacques Wilson

== Track listing ==
=== Side one ===
1. "Prologue" - 3:05
2. "Leave the Driving to Us" - 2:50
3. "Upset Strip" - 2:25
4. "Never Follow the Yellow-Green Road" - 2:40
5. "Thing-a-Ling (Scared Crow)" - 2:21
6. "In-man" - 1:28
7. "Man With the Word (Lyin' Coward)" - 2:00
8. "They're Off to Find the Wozard" - 1:40

=== Side two ===
1. "Blue Poppy" - 6:27
2. "I've Been Over the Rainbow" - 2:10
3. "Big Sur" - 3:20
4. "Killing of the Witch" - 3:35
5. "Finale" - 1:04

== Personnel ==
- Mort Garson – score, electronics
- Jacques Wilson – vocals
- Bill Lazarus – engineering
- Tom Wilkes – art director, cover illustration
- Guy Webster – photography
- Bernard Krause – producer

== Legacy ==
Kim Cooper, in the 2005 book Lost in the Grooves: Scram's Capricious Guide to the Music You Missed, described The Wozard of Iz as "the pinnacle of the rather small genre of psychedelic Wizard of Oz-themed albums", also citing The Wizard of Oz and Other Trans Love Trips, by the West Coast Workshop, in this genre. Garson's album was sampled by the Avalanches for their 2016 album Wildflower, and gave its name to one of the tracks on that album.
