= Synapse: The Electronic Music Magazine =

Synapse The Electronic Music Magazine
- Editor: Douglas Lynner
- Categories: Music magazine
- Frequency: Bi-monthly
- Publisher: Schill and Schill Publishing, Synapse Publishing Co.
- First issue: March 1, 1976
- Final issue: June 1, 1979
- Company: Synapse Publishing Co.
- Country: United States
- Based in: Los Angeles, CA
- Language: English

Synapse: The Electronic Music Magazine was a bi-monthly American magazine about synthesizers and electronic music published from March 1976 to June 1979. During an era when commercial synthesizers were still pretty new and mostly DIY, Synapse was notable for its high production values, interviews with famous musicians, and articles by well-known writers.

The first production team consisted of editor Douglas Lynner, art director Chris August, photographer Bill Matthias and technical illustrator/circulation/publisher Angela Schill. Staff changes brought managing editors Colin Gardner and Melodie Bryant. After 14 issues they ran out of funds and closed down. No notice was given to subscribers, nor were subscribers who were owed issues offered a pro rata refund.

The magazine issues have been scanned and posted online by its founder Cynthia Webster at Cyndustries. They have now been removed. but can now be found on Douglas Lynner site.

== Publication history ==
Issue	Date	Cover	Interviews	Featured Articles	Major Concert Reviews
Vol.1 No.1	March 1976	Line drawing	Alan R. Pearlman (ARP)	Devices for the Control of Synthesizers (Nyle Steiner), Frequency Reference Chart, In Search of the Musical Hemisphere (Alex Cima), Graphic Equalizers (Rob Lewis)	Live Electronic Music
Vol.1 No.2	Apr/May 1976	Line drawing	Morton Subotnick	Organizing an Electronic Concert, Copyrighting Electronic Music, Ephemeral Forms, Black Noise (score)	
Vol.1 No.3	Sep/Oct 1976	Kraftwerk	Ralf Hütter and Florian Schneider (Kraftwerk), Tom Oberheim, Larry Fast	Making Music with Calculators (Craig Anderton), Audium: Sound In Space (Phillip Elwood), Taking It To The Streets: The Electronic Music Mobile Assaults New York (Randy Cohen), Constructing an Arabesque Generator (Arpad Benares), Light With Sound (Alex Cima), A Seven-Stage Frequency Divider (John Blacet), How Computers Talk to Synthesizers (Peter Hillen), Time Vs. The Critics (Stan Levine)	Jasun Martz and the Neoteric Orchestra
Vol.1 No.4	Nov/Dec 1976	Malcolm Cecil and TONTO	Serge Tcherepnin, Bob Easton of 360 Systems, Malcolm Cecil	How Computers Store Numbers (Peter Hillen), Electronic Guerillas Invade Bay Area (Bob Davis), Sound Arts (Luther Donaldson), A Big Synthesizer's Little Helpers (Arpad Benares), Illusion and Motion (Alex Cima)	
Vol.1 No.5	Jan/Feb 1977	Gary Wright	Gary Wright, Patrick Gleeson	The Link Between Computers & Synthesizers Pt.1 (Peter Hillen), Philip Springer (Alex Cima), What To Do Until the 4-Track Arrives (Craig Anderton), Computer Meets Keyboard (Prentiss Knowlton), Walking Ring Sequencer (John Blacet), Liz Phillips in New York City (Randy Cohen), Pop Goes the Synthesizer (Jeff Janning), Touch Responsive Keyboard (Arpad Benares), Guerilla Electronics (Bob Davis)	Maggi Payne at Mills College
Vol.1 No.6	Mar/Apr 1977	Roger Powell & Todd Rundgren	Steve Hillage, Roger Powell & Todd Rundgren	Buying Your First Synthesizer (Alex Cima), New York Public Access Synthesizer Studio (PASS) (Phil Terr), Los Angeles Center for Electronic Music (LACEM) (Phil Terr), Synthesizers on the Eco-Front (about playing music to whales) (Will E. Jackson), The Left Hand & the Synthesizer (Craig Anderton), Audio-Video Synthesis (Jerry Hunt), Constructing a Programmer (Arpad Benares), The Link Between Computers & Synthesizers Pt.2 (Peter Hillen), Color Wheel (Danny Sofer)	Laserium
Vol.2 No.1	May/Jun 1977	Robert Moog	George Duke, Herbie Hancock, Robert Moog	Star Instruments, Inc. (Phil Terr), Learning Voltage Control (Alex Cima), A Closer Look at Digital Dronezilla (Phil Loarie), Analog Programming (Eric Valinsky), Vocal Synthesis (Peter Hillen), Modulation: Part One (Danny Sofer), The Link Between Computers & Synthesizers pt.3 (Peter Hillen)	Liz Phillips and Tangerine Dream
Vol.2 No.2	Jul/Aug 1977	Globe Graphic	Tangerine Dream, Bernie Krause	A Cosmic Sound Gets Down to Earth (Arman Matthews), Synthesized Video (Randy Cohen), Techniques of Electrophony (Eric Valinsky), Space Rockers Unite! (Magic Moe), Beyond the Clang Tone: Alternative Ring modulation (Stephan Bilow), Conceptual Traditionalism: The 57th Annual AES Convention (Eric Valinsky), Interfacing Acoustic, Electric & Electronic Keyboards with Synthesizers (Alex Cima), Modulation Part Two: Fast Modulation (Danny Sofer), High Points and High Jinks: The History of Electronic Music (John Adams & Bob Davis), Analog to Digital Conversion (Peter Hillen)	AES showcase
Vol.2 No.3	Nov/Dec 1977	Isao Tomita & Karlheinz Stockhausen	Isao Tomita, Karlheinz Stockhausen pt.1, John Simonton	Bridge Over Troubled Waters (Will E. Jackson), Digital Pattern Generator (John Blacet), Generating More Tracks from Four Tracks (Craig Anderton), Jinks 'n Points: The High History of Electronic Music (Bob Davis & John Adams), Processing & Controlling (Danny Sofer), Using an A/D Converter (Peter Hillen)	
Vol.2 No.4	Jan/Feb 1978	Jan Hammer	Timo Laine, Jan Hammer, Karlheinz Stockhausen pt.2, David Rosenboom	Profile: Jay Ellington Lee, Copyright Law Revised (Barton McLean), Production Professionalism in the Home Studio (Craig Anderton), The International Computer Music Conference (Eric Valinsky), Real-Time Electronic Music (Eric Valinsky), Voltage Controlled Clock with Event Arranger (John Blacet), An Electric Bass Controlled Synthesizer (Chris August), Ambience pt.1 (Danny Sofer), S/H and A/D Conversion (Peter Hillen)	
Vol.2 No.5	Mar/Apr 1978	Michael Hoenig	Edgar Froese, Michael Hoenig, Jean-Claude Risset	Profile: Stefan Weisser, Marketing Your Music (Magic Moe), Profile: Boston School of Electronic Music (Kenneth Perrin), Home Recording pt.2: Production Techniques (Craig Anderton), Patch Notation (Richard Bugg), Digital delay lines (Peter Hillen), Pitch Drift in Keyboard Synthesizers (Richard Diermer), Ambience pt.2 (Danny Sofer)	American Stockhausen Festival
Vol.2 No.6	May/Jun 1978	Devo	Frank Zappa pt.1, Devo, Cameron Jones, Don Preston	Let There Be Light: Composing Dynamic Laser Light Sculptures (Ron Pellegrino), Looking for an Electronic Music Class (Rodney Oakes), On Keeping Score (Robert Devoe), Guitar Synthesis (Doug Lynner & Ernie Perevoski), Computer Controlled Triggers & Gates (Peter Hillen)	David Bowie, Steve Hackett, The Screamers
Vol.3 No.1	Jan/Feb 1979	Brian Eno	Brian Eno, Frank Zappa pt.2, Larry Fast, Allen Strange	Profile: The Omega Intermedia Center, Synthesizer Basics (Kenneth Perrin), Controlling & Interfacing Synthesizers (Peter Hillen), Oberheim OB-1 Review (Melodie Bryant), ARP Avatar Review (Buzz Kettles), Lovely Music Records Review (Bob Davis), Computer Languages (Peter Hillen)	David Behrman, Devo, Captain Beefheart, Terry Riley
Vol.3 No.2	May/Jun 1979	Robert Fripp	Patrick Moraz, Robert Fripp, Patrick Gleeson	Profile: Karl Richardson & Albhy Galuten, Profile: Michael Boddicker, Synthesizers & Recording (Mark Styles), Languages/Systems (Peter Hillen), VCA Basics (Kenneth Perrin), Texas Instruments SN76477 (Craig Anderton), Profile: Jean-Luc Ponty	Herbie Hancock, Talking Heads, Jean-Luc Ponty, Larry Austin, Stewart Dempster, Moebius, Joan La Barbara
