= Ruth White (composer) =

American composer (1925-2013)

- Born: September 1, 1925; Pittsburgh, Pennsylvania, U.S.
- Died: August 26, 2013 (aged 87) Los Angeles, California, United States
- Genres: Electroacoustic, Experimental, Educational
- Occupations: Composer, Publisher
- Instruments: Moog synthesizer, Electronic organ
- Years active: 1955–2013
- Labels: Rhythms Productions, Tom Thumb Music

Ruth S. White (September 1, 1925 – August 26, 2013) was an American composer known for her electronic music compositions. While most of her career was dedicated to educational recordings, she is best known for being an electronic music pioneer, owing to her early explorations of sound using the Moog synthesizer. The back cover of her 1971 release Short Circuits stated that "Ruth White is considered among today's most gifted arbiters of what is termed 'the new music'".

Her early recordings 7 Trumps From the Tarot Cards and Pinions (1968), Flowers of Evil (1969), and Short Circuits (1970) all featured surprising uses of the Moog synthesizer as well as other electronic musical equipment.

== Biography ==
Ruth White studied music and composition and received three degrees from Carnegie Tech in Pennsylvania. While she focused on classical training in Piano, she also studied violin, cello, harp, clarinet, and horn. Recognized as gifted early on, White eventually studied under American avant-garde composer George Antheil. White credits Antheil with making her fully aware of the principles of classical sonata form, which provided "the key to writing larger works that were logical and structurally sound".

White's first studio was self-built in 1964, and was on display at The Fiske Museum for Musical Instruments in Pomona, California for a number of years. In 2008 these items were moved to The Musical Instrument Museum in Phoenix, an institution which opened in April 2010, but has only kept those donations in storage without any anticipated exhibit. With the creation of her own studio White developed her own brand of electronic music which explored new timbral and harmonic resources without renouncing the order and logic instilled by her classical training. Early on, Ruth became intrigued by electronic music possibilities. According to The Norton/Grove Dictionary of Women Composers,

"White's involvement in electronic music was precipitated by a belief that all experiments in traditional media from impressionism to atonality, polytonality and the like, were closed paths – that 'this' medium, with its fundamental key relationships, had been exhausted, had reached its zenith by the end of the nineteenth century, and, since then, its basic principles were being systematically destroyed. She also found much early electronic music 'chaotic and senseless', eventually concluding that those 'unshaped and arbitrary sounds being made were noise and just that."

Early on in White's career, her love of educational recordings was evident. Beginning in 1955 where she worked with Marilyn Horne and Richard Robinson on the recording Lullabies From 'Round the World. In 1957, White was commissioned by the Los Angeles Board of Education to record music for the Physical Education department for all of Los Angeles County Schools. These recordings – 5 box sets total – were called Folk Dances from 'Round the World. In 1967 White was commissioned by choreographer Eugene Loring (for the University of California) to create the music for a performance titled 7 Trumps From the Tarot Card and Pinions. The event was a success, and revealed Ruth's talent. The Los Angeles Times reviewed 7 Trumps as " …a really exciting, organically musical, electronic score by Ruth White. Not only the soloists but all the participants seemed to draw heat from this score…". Dance Magazine said "choreographed on contrasting planes, pinions comments on the wings of imagination and love, the shackles of philistinism, and always, Ruth White's specially written and especially eloquent score heightens the drama of the dance while plumbing its depths …. ". Ruth's musical recordings, (titled 7 Trumps From the Tarot Card and Pinions) from the show were also released on the increasingly experimental Limelight Records (1968).

In 1969 Ruth White's involvement in the arts community grew when she was elected to the local Los Angeles The National Academy of Recording Arts & Sciences (NARAS) chapter. She remained active in the NARAS for years. In 1972 Ruth White was elected to the National NARAS board where she served as Vice President.

In 1969 she recorded Flowers of Evil, a record based on French poet Charles Baudelaire's volume of poetry Les Fleurs du mal, reciting Baudelaire's words over electronic music. The poems are accented eerily by White's use of the Moog synthesizer. White's music was published on Limelight Records.

These recording were followed by "Short Circuits" (on Angel Records), and its French reissue "Klassik o'tilt" (on EMI), released respectively in 1970 and 1971. These releases marked a change in direction for White. Short Circuits was a radical shift from her darker soundscapes, and focused on original work, as well as synth versions of classical pieces. While maintaining her aim to publicize the use of electronic music, she used these releases to show the possibilities of synthesizers in classical music.

Perhaps because of these recordings, White, along with her close friend and fellow moog composer Paul Beaver, were invited to record with Tonto's Expanding Head Band. The idea for this recording was for each person involved to create a track, then send it to the next synthesist to add to the track. While White was a part of the work's founding, she never actually recorded any pieces. The album Zero Time (1971, Embryo Records) went on to gain legendary status.

In 1971 Ruth White took a different direction. She formed a film company through Cartridge Television properties (Cartridge TV or CTV). During this time she produced several stop animation films (then called "Analog Animation") titled "Garden of Delights for Kids No. 1", and included her musical score for "Hush Little Baby", "Hickory Dickory Dock", "Space Trip" and "Adventures in Underland". In 1971 her video "Steel" received an Atlanta Film Festival award. Also in the early 1970s she founded (with Paul Beaver) The Electronic Music Association. The Electronic Music Association gave concerts "to introduce audiences to new electroacoustic works."

This love of music eventually led White back to education. Most of the rest of White's musical career was spent developing music teaching materials for children and getting technology into the classroom. In 1973 she was producing "multi media" projects aimed at getting children to read. White realized early on that TV had changed how children learned. The audio without video was dead. In 1973 she was quoted as saying, "In the future, audio without visual, except for dance records, will be worthless". It was in 1973 she invented the character Mr. Windbag, a character she continued to use through her educational recording career with her series "The Adventure of Mr. Windbag". Her accomplishments in education resulted in her earning a Parents' Choice Award (1983) and an American Library Association 'notable recording' citation. Her interests led her to begin a children's books publishing company in Los Angeles. But her music was never far behind.

== Discography ==
Year	Title	Format Special Notes
1947	Songs From Japanese Poets	Musical Score
1950	Palestinian Song Cycle	Musical Score
1955	A Certain Slant of Light	Musical Score
1955	Rhythm Instruments With Folk Music From Many Lands	Vinyl, 7″ x3 Tom Thumb Records/Rhythms Productions
1955	Settings For Lullabies 'Round the World	LP Vinyl, 12″ Tom Thumb Records/Rhythms Productions (Re-issued 1976, 1999, 2005)
1957	Folk Dances From 'Round the World Vol. 1	Vinyl, 7″ x3 Rhythms Productions
1959	Folk Dances From 'Round the World Vol. 2	Vinyl, 7″ x3 Rhythms Productions
1959	Folk Dances From 'Round the World Vol. 3	Vinyl, 7″ x3 Rhythms Productions
1959	Folk Dances From 'Round the World Vol. 4	Vinyl, 7″ x3 Rhythms Productions
1960	Folk Dances From 'Round the World Vol. 5	Vinyl, 7″ x3 Rhythms Productions
1960	Good Neighbors; A Fiesta Of Latin American Folk Dances	Vinyl, 7″ x3 Rhythms Productions
1960	The Rhythms Hour	Vinyl, 7″ x3 Rhythms Productions
1960	Play Time-A Festival Of Rhythmic Dramatizations	Vinyl, 7″ x3 Rhythms Productions
1962	The Fundamentals Of Music for Dancers	Vinyl, 7″ x3 Rhythms Productions
1962	Motivations for Modern Dance	Vinyl, 7″ x3 Rhythms Productions
1962	The Holiday Sampler: Activity Songs for Christmas	Vinyl, 7″ x3 Rhythms Productions
1962	First Folk Dances	LP x2 Rhythms Productions
1965	Motifs For Dance Composition	Vinyl, 7″ x3 Rhythms Productions
1966	Music For Contemporary Dance (Vol 1)	Vinyl, 7″ x3 Rhythms Productions
1967	Music For Contemporary Dance (Vol 2)	Vinyl, 7″ x3 Rhythms Productions
1967	Adventures in Rhythms Vol 1	Vinyl, 7″ Rhythms Productions
1967	Adventures in Rhythms Vol 2	Vinyl, 7″ Rhythms Productions
1968	7 Trumps From the Tarot Cards and Pinions	LP, Vinyl, 12″ Limelight
1969	Flowers of Evil	LP, Vinyl, 12″ Limelight
1970	Short Circuits	Vinyl, 12″ Angel Records
1971	Klassik o'tilt	LP, Vinyl, 12″ EMI
1973	The Adventures of Mr Windbag in Metric Land	Cass/Film Strip Educational Products
1973	The Peppermint Tiger: And Other Activity Songs	LP, Vinyl, 12″ Tom Thumb Records/Rhythms Productions (Reissued as a Cassette 1985, 1999)
1973	Down Lolipop Lane	LP, Vinyl, 12″ Tom Thumb Records/Rhythms Productions (Reissued as cassette in 1985, 1999)
1973	Action Songs For Everyday Vol. 1	LP, Vinyl, 12″ Tom Thumb Records/Rhythms Productions
1973	Cotton Candy Castles: Activity Songs	LP, Vinyl, 12″ Tom Thumb Records/Rhythms Productions (Reissued as a Cassette 1985, 1999)
1973	Chocolate Choo Choo: And Other Activity Songs	LP, Vinyl, 12″ Tom Thumb Records/Rhythms Productions (Reissued as a Cassette in 1985, 1999)
1976	It's a Happy Feeling; And Other Activity Songs	LP, Vinyl, 12″ Tom Thumb Records/Rhythms Productions
1977	Fiddle-EE-fee	LP, Vinyl, 12″ Tom Thumb Records/Rhythms Productions (Reissued as a Cassette 1982)
1977	The Rhythm Makers	LP, Vinyl, 12″ Tom Thumb Records/Rhythms Productions
1977	I've Got a Reason to Sing	LP, Vinyl, 12″ Tom Thumb Records/Rhythms Productions (Reissued as a Cassette 1987)
1978	Musical Math: Beginning Concepts Vol. 1	LP, Vinyl, 12″ Tom Thumb Records/Rhythms Productions (Reissued as a Cassette 1999)
1978	Musical Math: Addition/Subtraction Vo1. 2	LP, Vinyl, 12″ Tom Thumb Records/Rhythms Productions (Reissued as a Cassette 1999)
1978	Musical Math: Multiplication Vol. 3 (Reissued as a Cassette 1999)	LP, Vinyl, 12″ Tom Thumb Records/Rhythms Productions
1979	Matematica Musical. Conceptos Basicos Volumen 1	LP, Vinyl, 12″ Tom Thumb Records/Rhythms Productions
1979	Matematica Musical. Volumen 2, Suma y Resta	LP, Vinyl, 12″ Tom Thumb Records/Rhythms Productions
1979	Matematica Musical. Volumen 3, Multiplicacion	LP, Vinyl, 12″ Tom Thumb Records/Rhythms Productions
1979	Action Songs for Holidays And Special Days	LP, Vinyl, 12″ / Cassette Tom Thumb Records/Rhythms Productions
1980	Animals Are Wonderful	LP, Vinyl, 12″ Rhythms Productions (reissued as cassette in 1984)
1980	Musical Reading	LP, Vinyl, 12″ X 3 Tom Thumb Records/Rhythms Productions
1995	Musical Reading: Alphabet, Vowels	LP, Vinyl, 12″ / Cassette Tom Thumb Records/Rhythms Productions
1980	Musical Reading: Consonants B through K	LP, Vinyl, 12″ / Cassette Tom Thumb Records/Rhythms Productions
1980	Musical Reading: Consonants L through Z	LP, Vinyl, 12″ / Cassette Tom Thumb Records/Rhythms Productions
1982	Singing Games	LP, Vinyl, 12″ / Cassette Tom Thumb Records/Rhythms Productions (Reissued as a Cassette 1999)
1982	Listen and Read	Box Set 5 Cass Rhythms Productions
1983	Sing Along with Mother Goose LP	LP, Vinyl, 12″/Activity Book Tom Thumb Records/Rhythms Productions (Reissued as a Cassette 1999)
1985	Bubblegum Band	Cassette Tom Thumb/ Rhythms Productions (Reissued as a Cassette 1999)
1985	Big Rock Candy Mountain	Cassette Tom Thumb/ Rhythms Productions (Reissued as a Cassette 1999)
1988	Mr. Windbag In Shape Land: Learn About Shapes (Reissued as a Cassette 1999)	Cassette Tom Thumb/ Rhythms Productions
1988	The Adventures of Mr. Windbag (The Line Country)	Cassette Tom Thumb/ Rhythms Productions
1988	Mr. Windbag and the Magic Cup Learn About Quantity (More/Less)	Cassette Tom Thumb/ Rhythms Productions
1988	Mr. Windbag and the Lollipop Race	Cassette Tom Thumb/ Rhythms Productions
1999	Tom Thumb's First Reader's Kit: "Hear, See, Say & Do" Activities	Box Set Rhythms Productions/Cheviot Corp-Audio
1999	Mr. Windbag in Shape Land: Learn About Shapes (Watch Me Grow Series)	Cassette Cheviot Corp-Audio/ Rhythms Productions
1999	Mr. Windbag in Shrink Land: Learn About Size (Watch Me Grow Series)	Cassette Cheviot Corp-Audio/ Rhythms Productions
1999	Mr. Windbag in the Line Country: Learn About Letters & Numbers	Cassette Cheviot Corp-Audio/ Rhythms Productions
1999	Mr. Windbag and the Magic Cup: Learn About Quantity (More/Less) (Watch Me Grow Series)	Cassette Cheviot Corp-Audio/ Rhythms Productions
1999	Mr. Windbag and the Birthday Party: Learn About Weight (Heavy/Light) (Watch Me Grow Series)	Cassette Cheviot Corp-Audio/ Rhythms Productions
1999	Mr. Windbag and the Lollipop Race (Watch Me Grow Series)	Cassette Cheviot Corp-Audio/ Rhythms Productions
1990 to present	work on Opera (in progress)	
