= Gail Laughton =

- Born: June 21, 1921; Tulsa, Oklahoma, U.S.
- Died: September 9, 1985 (aged 64)
- Genres: Jazz
- Instrument: Harp

Gail Laughton, born Denzil Gail Laughton (1921–1985), was an American jazz harpist. He worked in Hollywood, playing on many film and cartoon soundtracks.

== Early life ==
Laughton was born in Oklahoma. His parents were both involved with the harp: his mother as a teacher and his father, Charles T. Laughton, as a harp builder. As a young child, he played with his family's orchestra, touring Cuba and Panama. He joined the Oklahoma City Symphony in 1937, hired through the WPA at the minimum age of 15.

== Career ==
Laughton appeared regularly on the Al Pearce Show, a weekly radio broadcast, beginning in 1942. Laugton performs as Cary Grant's hands and arms during the harp-playing scene in The Bishop's Wife.

== Discography ==
=== Albums, as performer ===
- A Streetcar Named Desire soundtrack (Capitol Records, 1951)
- Gandharva - Beaver & Krause (Warner Brothers Records, 1971)

=== Solo album ===
- Harps of the Ancient Temples (Rapture, 1969) - "The shimmering, ethereal quality of the harp sings out under [his] loving care." The track 'Pompeii 76 A.D.' from this LP was used in the movie Blade Runner, mislabeled as "Harp of the Ancient Temples" and/or "Bicycle Riders".

=== Singles ===
- Mel Tormé with Hal Mooney & His Orchestra, 11/16/1947 session: "I Cover the Waterfront" bw "County Fair" (Musicraft 5009), "A Foggy Day" (Musicraft 589) "Makin' Whoopee" (Musicraft 534), "Little White Lies" (Musicraft 558), "Do It Again" (Musicraft 534), "Night and Day" (Musicraft 538)
- Ben Light, "When Day is Done"/"Cocktails for Two" (Tempo TR-608)
