= Black Mass Lucifer =

1971 electronic instrumental album by Mort Garson

Studio album by Mort Garson
- Released: 1971
- Genre: Electronic, experimental, ambient
- Length: 29:03
- Label: Uni Records
- Producer: Patchcord Productions, Hollywood, California

Professional ratings
Review scores
Source	Rating
AllMusic	4/5 stars

Black Mass Lucifer is an electronic instrumental album by Mort Garson first released in 1971.

== Background ==
The music is composed and performed entirely by Garson himself on Moog synthesizers. While this record exhibits elements of occult rock in a sometimes sinister tone, it is nonetheless in the vein of Garson's other synthesizer-based music. Black Mass Lucifer is described as employing sounds typical of modular synthesis such as "abstract electronic sound effects," "white noise bursts," "twittering scales," "percolating synthesizers," and "synthetic bells."

After Black Mass Lucifer's original 1971 release on Uni Records (owned by MCA), it was out of print for at least 35 years. In 2018 the album was reissued on CD by Rubellan Remasters via UMG.

Despite its low profile, the record has its fans, with one reviewer referring to it as "freaky and intense" and Garson's "masterpiece." Another noted that the record was created at the same time occult topics were highlighted in music (Black Sabbath), movies (Rosemary's Baby and The Exorcist), and recent events (the Tate murders).

The album has been given an authorized vinyl reissue in 2019 by Sacred Bones Records along with several other out-of-print Garson titles. The Sacred Bones edition replicates the original Uni rainbow label (with the Sacred Bones logo replacing the Uni one).

== Track listing ==
Side one
No.	Title	Length
1.	"Solomon's Ring"	3:20
2.	"The Ride Of Aida (Voodoo)"	3:07
3.	"Incubus"	3:29
4.	"Black Mass"	3:39
5.	"The Evil Eye"	2:10

Side two
No.	Title	Length
6.	"Exorcism"	3:45
7.	"The Philosopher's Stone"	3:27
8.	"Voices Of The Dead (The Medium)"	2:05
9.	"Witch Trial"	3:00
10.	"ESP"	1:01

== Personnel ==
- Mort Garson – composition and realization
- Eugene Hamblin – electronic engineering
- Virginia Clark – jacket design
- Dave Williams – direction
