= The Zodiac: Cosmic Sounds =

1967 collaborative concept album

The Zodiac - Cosmic Sounds

Studio album
- Released: May 20, 1967
- Recorded: April 1967
- Genres: Psychedelic rock, spoken word, exotica
- Length: 38:25
- Labels: Elektra; Reissued by Water Records
- Producer: Alex Hassilev

Professional ratings
Review scores
Source	Rating
Allmusic	3/5 stars

The Zodiac: Cosmic Sounds is a 1967 collaborative concept album on the theme of the signs of the Zodiac. It was issued by Elektra Records in and featured early use of the Moog synthesizer by Paul Beaver, with music written by Mort Garson, words by Jacques Wilson, and narration by Cyrus Faryar. Instrumentation was provided by members of the Wrecking Crew studio collective. It has been variously described as "a wonderful period piece" and "apt to inspire more giggle fits than stoned, pull-the-shades-down reveries".

== Concept ==
The idea began in 1967 with Jac Holzman, the head of Elektra Records, which had just gained major success with The Doors' debut album. Holzman had the initial concept for the album, and hired Alex Hassilev, a member of The Limeliters, to produce it. Hassilev in turn brought in Mort Garson, with whom he had just formed a production company, to write the music. Hassilev and Garson had planned to do a series of concept albums following Cosmic Sounds. Garson wrote music for one of the other intended albums, The Sea, but Rod McKuen, who was supposed to have been on the project, left and did his own version with Anita Kerr. Hassilev temporarily left the project to produce The Dusk 'Till Dawn Orchestra's Sea Drift album, which incorporated part of The Sea's intended theme.

== Recording ==
Garson brought together a mixture of musicians, most of whom were not credited on the album sleeve. Musician and electronic instrument collector Paul Beaver, who had done music effects for films, was chosen to perform on the Moog synthesizer on the album since he was one of the few people on the West Coast who knew how to set up and use the synthesizer at the time. Beaver and Moog went to the California Audio Engineering Society convention in 1967 to showcase the Moog Synthesizer for the first time on the West Coast. Emil Richards, who had worked with such musicians as Frank Zappa, Marvin Gaye and Henry Mancini, was chosen to provide an assortment of percussive instrumental surprises throughout the album. Bassist Carol Kaye and drummer Hal Blaine, both top on-demand session musicians, were The Zodiac's rhythm section. Bud Shank, a top flute performer, and keyboardist Mike Melvoin were also used. Jacques Wilson wrote the album's narration, and folk singer Cyrus Faryar was chosen (suggested by Hassilev) to narrate over the album's exotic instrumentation.

The album was released in May 1967. The sleeve, by artist Abe Gurvin and art director William S. Harvey (who had worked together at Nonesuch Records), featured a florid psychedelic design. On the back, in large purple letters, were written the instructions: "Must be played in the dark".

== Response ==
According to music critic Richie Unterberger:

Divided into 12 separate tracks, one for each astrological sign, it appeared just as both psychedelic rock and astrology itself were coming into vogue in the youthful counterculture. In some respects it was similar to other instrumental psychsploitation albums of the time, with a spacy yet tight groove that could have fit into the soundtrack of 1966 Sunset Strip documentaries, played in large measure by seasoned Los Angeles session musicians. In other respects, it was futuristic, embellished by some of the first Moog synthesizer ever heard on a commercial recording, an assortment of exotic percussive instruments, and sitar. The arrangements were further decorated by haunting harpsichord and organ, along with standard mid-1960s Los Angeles rock guitar licks. For those who took the astrology as seriously as the music, there was the dramatic reading of narrator Cyrus Faryar, musing upon aspects of each astrological sign in a rich, deep voice without a hint of irony.

Garson collaborated with Wilson in 1968 on another concept album, The Wozard of Iz, on that occasion with producer Bernie Krause. Paul Beaver later collaborated with Krause on several albums. Garson later recorded several further LPs on individual zodiac signs, and became best known for composing music for National Geographic programming, though he did not, as sometimes repeated, compose its theme song.

In the liner notes for the 1997 Moody Blues compilation The Best of the Moody Blues, Justin Hayward named this album as an influence on the band's development going into Days of Future Passed.

== Track listing ==
All lyrics written by Jacques Wilson

1. "Aries – The Fire-Fighter" – 3:17
2. "Taurus – The Voluptuary" – 3:38
3. "Gemini – The Cool Eye" – 2:50
4. "Cancer – The Moon Child" – 3:27
5. "Leo – The Lord of Lights" – 2:30
6. "Virgo – The Perpetual Perfectionist" – 3:05
7. "Libra – The Flower Child" – 3:28
8. "Scorpio – The Passionate Hero" – 2:51
9. "Sagittarius – The Versatile Daredevil" – 2:06
10. "Capricorn – The Uncapricious Climber" – 3:30
11. "Aquarius – The Lover of Life" – 3:45
12. "Pisces – The Peace Piper" – 3:19

== Personnel ==
- Cyrus Faryar – narration
- Paul Beaver – Moog and other electronic instruments
- Emil Richards – exotic percussion
- Bud Shank – bass flute
- Hal Blaine – drums
- Carol Kaye – bass guitar
- Mike Melvoin – keyboards
- Produced by Alex Hassilev
- Music written by Mort Garson
