= Beaver & Krause =

American musical duo

- Origin: Los Angeles, U.S.
- Genres: Experimental, electronic
- Years active: 1966–1975
- Labels: Nonesuch, Limelight, Warner Bros.
- Past members: Paul Beaver; Bernie Krause

Beaver & Krause were an American musical duo comprising Paul Beaver and Bernie Krause. Their 1967 album The Nonesuch Guide to Electronic Music was a pioneering work in the electronic music genre. The pair were Robert Moog's sales representatives on the U.S. West Coast and were instrumental in popularizing the Moog synthesizer during the late 1960s. As recording artists for Warner Bros. Records in the early 1970s, they released the critically admired albums In a Wild Sanctuary and Gandharva.

== Career ==
=== As Moog exponents ===
Having met each other through session work, Paul Beaver and Bernie Krause began collaborating in 1966. Both were drawn to the creative potential of electronic musical instruments.

In June 1967, Beaver and Krause set up a booth at the Monterey Pop Festival, demonstrating their newly purchased electronic synthesizer, one of the first constructed by Robert Moog. They served as the Moog company's sales representatives on the U.S. West Coast. As such, the pair were able to exploit the growing fascination among rock and pop musicians for the new synthesizer sounds, an interest that was partly influenced by these artists' consumption of hallucinogenic drugs, and the increasingly generous advances they received from their record companies. At Monterey and over the following few years, Beaver and Krause sold the instrument to a number of American pop and rock acts. Beaver introduced Micky Dolenz of the Monkees to the Moog, which became a featured instrument on the band's 1967 album Pisces, Aquarius, Capricorn & Jones Ltd. Beaver himself performed on the track "Star Collector". In addition, he led workshops at the Beaver & Krause LA studio attended by film composers and session keyboardists.

Among the other pop and rock artists introduced to the Moog by Beaver and Krause, as part of a vogue that emerged in the late 1960s, were the Byrds, the Doors and Simon & Garfunkel. Krause sold a Moog III to George Martin, producer of the Beatles, and another to George Harrison during the latter's 1968 visit to California, where Harrison was producing an album by Apple Records artist Jackie Lomax. Harrison used the instrument to generate his 1969 solo album Electronic Sound for the Apple spin-off label Zapple. Side two of this disc consisted of an edited treatment of Krause's initial Moog demonstration, which, according to Krause, Harrison had recorded without his consent.

The duo were also in demand as film and television soundtrack performers. Among the films featuring music played on the Moog by one or both of the pair were: The Graduate, In Cold Blood, Point Blank and Cool Hand Luke (all 1967); Rosemary's Baby, Candy and I Love You, Alice B. Toklas (1968); They Shoot Horses, Don't They? (1969); and Catch-22, Performance and Love Story (1970). On these soundtrack projects, Beaver and Krause's contributions were based on other composers' work and vision. According to an announcement in Billboard magazine, the "first major film" to feature a score written by Beaver & Krause was The Final Programme in 1973.

=== As recording artists ===
In 1968, Beaver & Krause released an album for Mercury Records imprint Limelight Records, Ragnarok. Following their success in popularizing the Moog, they signed with Warner Bros. Records. They recorded three albums for the company: In a Wild Sanctuary (1970), Gandharva (1971) and All Good Men (1972). Writing for Saturday Review magazine in 1970, Ellen Sandler described In a Wild Sanctuary as "a powerful ecological statement in movement and sound". Gandharva was partly recorded in Grace Cathedral in San Francisco and included musical contributions from Gerry Mulligan, Bud Shank, Mike Bloomfield and Ronnie Montrose. The album was marketed as "the score to a non-existent film" and reflected Hindu mythological themes.

According to authors Trevor Pinch and Frank Trocco, the technique used on the Wild Sanctuary track "Spaced"—whereby a single note appears to approach listeners from a distance before resolving in a dramatic chord—was "copied by a famous Marin County film company" to introduce its cinema presentations. In Krause's 1998 autobiography, Into a Wild Sanctuary: A Life in Music & Natural Sound, he says that this well-known sound logo begins on the same first note (a G pedal tone) as "Spaced", splits into an eight-tone glissando with four notes rising and four descending, and ends on the same open (D Major) chord.

== Beaver's death and aftermath ==
The duo ended with Beaver's premature death in January 1975, at age 49. At the time he was working on a revised version of The Nonesuch Guide, having released a solo album, Perchance to Dream. Krause then released two solo albums of his own: Citadels of Mystery in 1979 and Gorillas in the Mix in 1988. He also scored music and/or effects for many films, including Apocalypse Now, on synthesizer.

Krause subsequently specialized almost exclusively in the recording and archiving of natural soundscapes from wild habitats worldwide and became a major influence in the introduction to bioacoustics of the fields of soundscape ecology and ecoacoustics. In 2014, he collaborated with Richard Blackford, former composer-in-residence at Balliol College, Oxford, to compose a symphony titled The Great Animal Orchestra Symphony for Orchestra and Wild Soundscapes, commissioned and performed by the BBC National Orchestra of Wales. The symphony echoed the pioneering ecoacoustic approach of Beaver & Krause's In a Wild Sanctuary, and featured the first full orchestration combining wild soundscapes performed live as a component of orchestration. Krauses extensive original library of nature sounds from around the world was lost in the North Bay wild fires of 2017. Fortunately, his irreplaceable nature sound archive — thousands of hours — was digitized and backed up off-site, but the loss of all the original media, his recording equipment and decades of memorabilia were reduced to ashes. https://www.kqed.org/science/1917478/amid-the-north-bay-fire-ruins-a-lost-sanctuary-for-natures-music

== Sources ==
- Brend, Mark (2012). The Sound of Tomorrow: How Electronic Music Was Smuggled into the Mainstream. London: Bloomsbury Academic. ISBN 978-0-8264-2452-5.
- Holmes, Thom (2012). Electronic and Experimental Music: Technology, Music, and Culture (4th ed.). New York, NY: Routledge. ISBN 978-0-415-89636-8.
- Pinch, Trevor; Trocco, Frank (2002). Analog Days: The Invention and Impact of the Moog Synthesizer. Cambridge, MA: Harvard University Press. ISBN 0-674-01617-3.
- Prendergast, Mark (2003). The Ambient Century: From Mahler to Moby – The Evolution of Sound in the Electronic Age. New York, NY: Bloomsbury. ISBN 1-58234-323-3.
