= Mort Garson =

Pioneering electronic music composer, arranger, and songwriter (1924–2008)

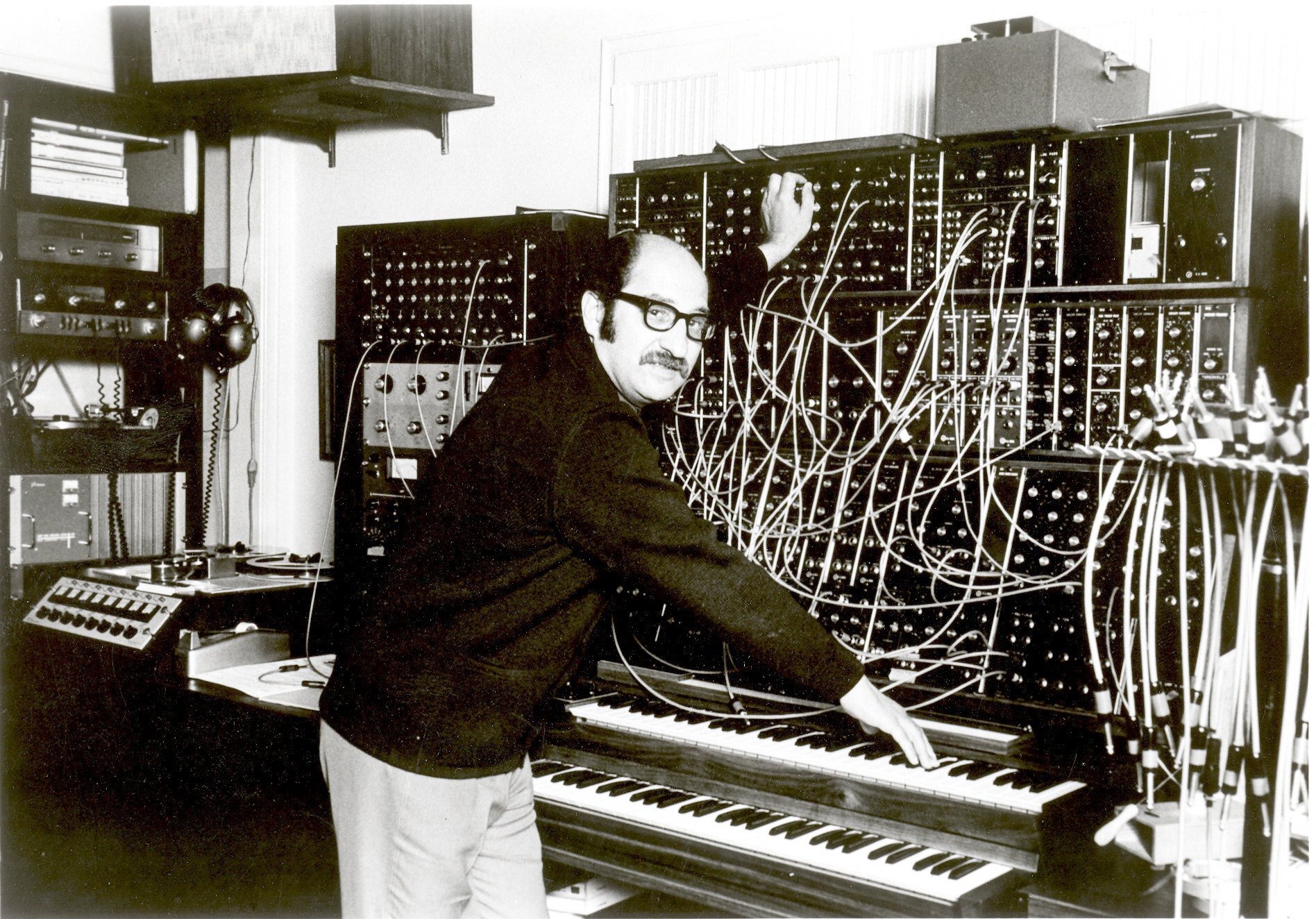
- Garson in 1969

Background information
- Born: Morton Sanford Garson; 20 July 1924; Saint John, New Brunswick, Canada
- Died: 4 January 2008 (aged 83) San Francisco, California, U.S.
- Genres: Electronic music; easy listening; rock; pop
- Occupations: Songwriter; composer; arranger
- Instruments: Piano; Moog synthesizer
- Years active: 1940s–1980s
- Website: mort-garson.com

Morton Sanford Garson (20 July 1924 – 4 January 2008) was a Canadian composer, arranger, songwriter, and pioneer of electronic music. He is best known for his albums in the 1960s and 1970s, such as Mother Earth's Plantasia (1976). He also co-wrote several hit songs, including "Our Day Will Come", a hit for Ruby & the Romantics. According to Allmusic, Mort Garson boasts one of the most distinctive and outright bizarre resumés in popular music, spanning from easy listening to occult-influenced space-age electronic pop.

== Early life ==
Mort Garson was born in Saint John, New Brunswick, Canada, the son of Russian Jewish refugees. He later moved to New York City where he studied music at the Juilliard School of Music. He worked as a pianist and arranger before being called into the Army near the end of World War II.

== Early career ==
After leaving the forces he became an active session musician, with an ability to carry out any or all of the musical chores on any given session: composer, arranger, orchestrator, conductor, and pianist as required. In 1957, he co-wrote Brenda Lee's minor hit "Dynamite" with Tom Glazer, and he also co-wrote Cliff Richard's 1961 UK hit "Theme for a Dream". In 1963, with lyricist Bob Hilliard, he wrote one of the great lounge hits of the 1960s, "Our Day Will Come", a hit for Ruby & The Romantics.

Garson spent the mid-1960s on a rapid succession of accompaniment and arrangement jobs: two Doris Day albums (Doris Day's Sentimental Journey and Latin for Lovers), Mel Tormé's Right Now! album of contemporary covers like "Secret Agent Man," and Glenn Yarborough's highly successful cover of Rod McKuen songs, The Lonely Things. He also arranged for the Lettermen on Capitol Records, provided background to Laurence Harvey reading poetry on Atlantic Records, and provided arrangements for Esther Phillips, Julie London, Nancy Wilson, Chris Montez, Leslie Uggams, Joanie Sommers, Paul Revere and the Raiders, and many others. He was a favorite of producers when the job involved soft pop vocal groups and string ensembles, and was responsible for a wide variety of easy listening records, including Bossa Nova for All Ages by the Continentals, Symphony for the Soul by the Total Eclipse, and Sea Drift by the Dusk 'Til Dawn Orchestra. In 1967, he arranged and produced Bill Withers' early single "Three Nights and a Morning".

With Perry Botkin Jr., he arranged and conducted easy listening arrangements of big pop hits, among them the Hollyridge Strings' Play the Beatles Songbook album series and their Play the Hits of Simon & Garfunkel. He also worked on albums and singles by The Sugar Shoppe, the Sunset Strings, and the Love Strings, and released singles under his own name. He arranged The Sandpipers' 1966 hit "Guantanamera", and co-wrote its B-side "What Makes You Dream, Pretty Girl?" with lyricist Jacques Wilson, with whom he worked on later projects.

== Later career ==
In 1967, Garson met Robert Moog at a music engineers' convention, and became one of the first arrangers and composers to work with the early Moog synthesizer; his electronic albums from the period are now highly prized among collectors and exotica fans. When he met Moog, Garson had already been working on a suite (with lyricist Jacques Wilson) called The Zodiac: Cosmic Sounds—Celestial Counterpoint with Words and Music, which includes tracks for each of the 12 signs of the zodiac; he decided to incorporate Moog's invention into the album. The recording features Paul Beaver on a variety of electronic instruments with voice-overs by Cyrus Faryar. Released in late 1967 on Elektra Records, it was the first album recorded on the West Coast to make use of the Moog synthesizer.

Also in 1967, he arranged the obscure single "See The Cheetah", credited to the Big Game Hunters. In 1968, he was responsible for the string arrangements on Glen Campbell's international hit "By the Time I Get to Phoenix," and arranged two tracks on his album of the same title.

Another of Garson's albums using the Moog, Electronic Hair Pieces, covered songs from the hippie-influenced musical Hair. The mod album cover art for Electronic Hair Pieces featured a model with a wired-up skull; liner notes were provided by Tom Smothers of the Smothers Brothers. Another album, The Wozard of Iz, a psychedelic satire based on The Wizard of Oz, also with words by Jacques Wilson, featured Bernie Krause providing environmental sound effects and Suzie Jane Hokom voicing Dorothy. Garson was quoted at the time: "An electronic composer utilizes synthesizer as a means of expression… Of course he must remain master of the instrument and not vice versa, but given the unique vehicle, he has the medium in which, almost literally, the sky's the limit for his imagination."

Following the success of the original Zodiac LP, Garson went on to compose and arrange a 12-album series of zodiac albums for A&M Records, one album for each sign. Like Zodiac, each album contained original tunes with heavy use of electronics. In 1971, he composed an entirely instrumental electronic Black Mass album, released on Uni Records under the pseudonym Lucifer, that again featured the Moog. Jason Alkeny at Allmusic describes the Black Mass album as "undoubtedly...his masterpiece". Garson also released, in 1972, a record of music-and-moans, Music for Sensuous Lovers, to capitalize on the best-seller at the time, The Sensuous Woman by "Z". In 1974, he composed the electronic music score for the 18th Annual Grammy Award-winning Best Children's Recording of The Little Prince narrated by Richard Burton. The following year, he released an album titled Ataraxia: The Unexplained designed to accompany meditations to the mantra of the listener's choice. Mother Earth's Plantasia, which was released in 1976, was a series of Moog compositions designed to be played for growing plants. According to his daughter, Day Darmet, Garson made the album inspired by her mother's plants. Despite its extremely limited distribution, the album became a cult hit in the late 2010s when it was circulated online. Plantasia's popularity was boosted by its sampling in Pharcyde's track "Guestlist", from the 2000 album "Plain Rap".

In 2018, independent reissue label Rubellan Remasters licensed and released on CD for the first time Garson's two occult-themed albums, remastered from original studio tapes. In 2019 and 2020, a further set of Garson albums, including Plantasia, which is now seen as his best-known album, and a set of previously unreleased recordings, Music from Patch Cord Productions, were issued both on CD and vinyl by Sacred Bones.

== Films, television and theatre work ==
Garson also worked in television and film, scoring a wide variety of music for many different movies and TV shows, from Beware! The Blob! to Kentucky Fried Movie to National Geographic specials, although it is Elmer Bernstein who is credited with composing the well-known National Geographic orchestral theme that first appeared in on the magazine's TV specials in 1966.

Garson's music was used as incidental music during the television transmissions of the Apollo 11 crewed Moon landing by Neil Armstrong and Buzz Aldrin in 1969. He said:

"The only sounds that go along with space travel are electronic ones.… The Apollo film shows different facets of the flight—blast-off, separation of the stages of the rocket, scenes of the moon at close range, of the astronauts playing games in the ship, and of earth rise. [The music] has to carry the film along. It has to echo the sound of the blastoff and even the static you hear on the astronauts' report from space. People are used to hearing things from outer space, not just seeing them. So I used a big, symphonic sound for the blast-off, some jazzy things for the zero-G game of catch, psychedelic music for a section that uses negatives and diffuse colors on shots taken inside the ship, and a pretty melody for the moon. After all, it's still a lovely moon."

In 1972 he wrote the music for the Larry Hagman-directed movie Son of Blob (also known as Beware! The Blob). He also scored the 1974 Fred Williamson film Black Eye, and adapted the music for Mel Brooks' and Carl Reiner's 1975 animated television special The 2000 Year Old Man.

In 1983 he composed the score for the West End musical Marilyn! which opened at the Adelphi Theatre on 17 March 1983. Jacques Wilson wrote the lyrics for the show which starred Stephanie Lawrence as Marilyn Monroe. He then scored the action films The Treasure of the Amazon (1985) and Vultures (1987), which both starred Stuart Whitman.

In 2002, Garson composed the score for When Garbo Talks! a musical with book and lyrics by Buddy Kaye that had its world premiere 15 October 2010 at the Long Beach Performing Arts Center, International City Theatre.

Garson was closely associated with Heatter-Quigley Productions, creating the theme songs and music cues for the following TV game shows:

- Amateur's Guide to Love
- Gambit
- Runaround
- Baffle
- The Magnificent Marble Machine
- Battlestars

The music for the first five featured Garson playing synthesizers, but the Battlestars package used more conventional marching band orchestration.

== Death ==
Garson died of renal failure in San Francisco in 2008, at the age of 83.

== In popular culture ==
A sample from Garson's "Planetary Motivations (Cancer)" was incorporated into DJ Shadow's 1996 song "Building Steam with a Grain of Salt," from the album Endtroducing...... In the 1994 Peter Lynch short film Arrowhead, Ray Bud (played by Don McKellar) manipulates a dead fish while singing Mort Garson's closing theme of the 1970s Canadian nature program Untamed World. The song "Plantasia" from the album Mother Earth's Plantasia is used in the documentary Lil Bub & Friendz and in the German TV show Böhmi brutzelt with Jan Böhmermann. It was also included in an advertisement for Intuit TurboTax in the United States.

"Deja Vu" was used as the main theme for most of "Balance", the first arc of the Maximum Fun podcast The Adventure Zone, with "The Unexplained," "Astral Projection," "Cabala," "Wind Dance," "Tarot," and "Music to Soothe the Savage Snake Plant" also being used later on the series as an alternate theme and as background music, respectively, along with a cover version of "Plantasia," arranged by Griffin McElroy. The song was also sampled on Kid Cudi’s 2016 song "Baptized in Fire", from his album Passion, Pain & Demon Slayin', which also features Travis Scott. Canadian-American indie pop artist Curtis Waters has cited Mother Earth's Plantasia as an influence on his own work.

== Discography ==
=== Studio albums ===
| Title | Released | Label | Peak chart position |
|---|---|---|---|
| Dance Along With Jacky Noguez And His Orchestra | 1960 | Jamie | |
| The Continentals Present Bossa Nova for All Ages | 1963 | Canadian American | |
| Jennie Smith – Nightly Yours On The Steve Allen Show | 1963 | Canadian American | |
| A Portrait Of Arthur Prysock | 1963 | Old Town Records | |
| Dusk 'Til Dawn Orchestra – Sea Drift | 1967 | Elektra | |
| The Love Strings of Mort Garson – Love Sounds | 1968 | Liberty | |
| The Wozard of Iz | 1968 | A&M Records | |
| Mort Garson – Electronic Hair Pieces | 1969 | A&M Records | |
| Mort Garson – Didn't You Hear? | 1970 | Custom Fidelity | |
| Black Mass Lucifer | 1971 | UNI Records | |
| Ataraxia – The Unexplained (Electronic Musical Impressions of the Occult) | 1975 | RCA | |
| Mother Earth's Plantasia | 1976 | Homewood Records | 6 (US Independent Albums) |
| Merrill Heatter's Battle Stars And Other Game Show Music | 1981 | G-Note Records | |

=== Posthumous releases ===
| Title | Released | Label | Recorded |
|---|---|---|---|
| A Mixed Tape of Music By Mort Garson | 2019 | Sacred Bones Records | 1957–1978 |
| Music From Patch Cord Productions | 2020 | Sacred Bones Records | 1968-1977 |
| Journey to the Moon and Beyond | 2023 | Sacred Bones Records | 1969-1974 |

=== Mini-albums ===
| Title | Year | Label |
|---|---|---|
| The Total Eclipse – Symphony for Soul | 1967 | Imperial |
| Signs of the Zodiac – Aries | 1969 | A&M Records |
| Signs of the Zodiac – Taurus | 1969 | A&M Records |
| Signs of the Zodiac – Gemini | 1969 | A&M Records |
| Signs of the Zodiac – Cancer | 1969 | A&M Records |
| Signs of the Zodiac – Leo | 1969 | A&M Records |
| Signs of the Zodiac – Virgo | 1969 | A&M Records |
| Signs of the Zodiac – Libra | 1969 | A&M Records |
| Signs of the Zodiac – Scorpio | 1969 | A&M Records |
| Signs of the Zodiac – Sagittarius | 1969 | A&M Records |
| Signs of the Zodiac – Capricorn | 1969 | A&M Records |
| Signs of the Zodiac – Aquarius | 1969 | A&M Records |
| Signs of the Zodiac – Pisces | 1969 | A&M Records |
| Z – Music for Sensuous Lovers | 1971 | Sensuous Records |

=== Singles and EPs ===
| Title | Released | Label | Album |
|---|---|---|---|
| Mort Garson's Orchestra and Chorus (With David Hill) – "Wild Child" / "Big Guitar" | 1958 | RCA | |
| Mort Garson and His Orchestra (With Barbara Evans) – "A Little Girl Cried" / "Oo La La La La" | 1959 | RCA | |
| Mort Garson and His Orchestra (With Barbara Evans) – "Pray for Me Mother" / "Oo La La La La" | 1959 | RCA | |
| Mort Garson and His Orchestra – "Drum Tango" / "Gas Light Village" | 1959 | Todd | |
| Mort Garson – "Puppet on a String" / "Scotch Freight" | 1959 | Carol | |
| Mort Garson – "Madagascar" / "Shoo Bird" | 1960 | MGM Records | |
| Mort Garson Orchestra – "Cry for Happy" / "Yes, We Have No Bananas" | 1961 | Oriole | |
| The Conductor With Mort Garson Orchestra – "Pony Train" / "Bla, Bla, Bla Cha Cha Cha" | 1961 | Jamie | |
| Mort Garson (With Guy Mitchell) – "Soft Rain" / "Big Big Change" | 1961 | Columbia | |
| Mort Garson and His Orchestra – "Honeysuckle Rose" / "Early Sunday" | 1962 | Joy Records | |
| Mort Garson and His Orchestra – "Bowl-a-Rama Stomp" / "The Stripper's Sister" | 1963 | G-Note Records | |
| Mort Garson – "Allison" / "La Nobile Arte" | 1965 | Columbia | |
| The Love Strings of Mort Garson – "A Quiet Sunday" / "The Apartment" | 1968 | Liberty | The Love Strings of Mort Garson – Love Sounds |
| Mort Garson – The Connection | 1968 | Patch Cord Productions | |
| Mort Garson – "(Prologue From) The Wozard of Iz" (same song featured on both sides) | 1968 | A&M Records | The Wozard of Iz – An Electronic Odyssey |
| Mort Garson – Pure Electronics (The Amazing Sound of the Moog Synthesizer) | 1969 | A&M Records | Mort Garson – Electronic Hair Pieces |
| Z – "Theme from Music for Sensuous Lovers (Part I)" / "Theme from Music For Sensuous Lovers (Part II)" | 1971 | Sensuous Records | Z – Music for Sensuous Lovers |
| Mort Garson & Paul Frees – Edgar Allen Poe's Tell-Tale Heart | ???? | Custom Fidelity | |
| The Lords of Percussion – "The Kung-Fu" / "Geisha Girl" | 1974 | Old Town Records | |
| Ataraxia – "The Unexplained (Instrumental)" / "Deja Vu (Instrumental)" | 1975 | RCA | Ataraxia – The Unexplained (Electronic Musical Impressions of the Occult) |
| Captain D.J. – "Disco UFO (Part I)" / "Disco UFO (Part II)" | 1978 | G-Note Records | |
