= Unplayed by Human Hands =

"Unplayed By Human Hands" are the titles of two album recordings made in the mid-1970s of computerized organ performances recorded at the All Saints Church in Pasadena, California on their 90-rank Schlicker pipe organ. The project was headed by Prentiss Knowlton, a student of computer science at the University of Utah.

The computer employed for the task of controlling the pipe organ was a PDP-8 minicomputer manufactured by Digital Equipment Corporation (DEC) in 1965.

Electronics by Robert Bennion and James Henry. Computer programming by Alan C. Ashton, Robert Bennion, James Henry and Prentiss Knowlton. Music programming by Prentiss Knowlton, James Henry and R. Kent Asmussen.

== Track listing ==
=== unplayed by human hands - a computer performed organ recital - CR 9115 ===
Cover of the "recital" album. CR 9115

==== Side 1 ====
1. RIMSKY-KORSAKOV: FLIGHT OF THE BUMBLE-BEE
2. ROGER DUCASSE: PASTORALE IN F
3. MOZART: OVERTURE FROM THE MARRIAGE OF FIGARO, K. 492
4. JOPLIN: MAPLE LEAF RAG

==== Side 2 ====
1. BACH: CONCERTO IN A MINOR (after Vivaldi), BWV 593
2. IVES: VARIATIONS ON AMERICA

=== unplayed by human hands - in concert on the ninety-rank schlicker pipe organ - CH 9771 ===
Cover of the "in concert" album. CH 9771

==== Side 1 ====
1. Franz Schubert: INSTANT MUSIC
2. Dudley Buck: NEW ANGLES ON THE STAR-SPANGLED BANNER
3. Felix-Alexandre Guilmant: MARCHING-SONG OF THE ANGEL OF DEATH

==== Side 2 ====
1. Dietrich Buxtehude: FANTASIA IN THE LAND OF THE FREE
2. Johan Halvorsen: ENTRY OF THE PRIVILEGED LANDHOLDING CLASS
3. Vladimir Ussachevsky: FANTASY: EVERYTHING IS COMPUTERIZED

==== Actual titles ====
The names of the songs as printed on this album are distorted in one way or another. The following is a list of the actual titles and their composers.

1. 6 Moments musicaux, Op.94 D.780 - No.3 in F minor (Allegro moderato) by Franz Schubert (1797 - 1828)
2. The Star spangled banner : concert variations for organ by Dudley Buck (1839 - 1909)
3. Marche funèbre et chant séraphique, opus 17 by Félix-Alexandre Guilmant (1837 - 1911)
4. Fantasia in F by Dietrich Buxtehude (1637 - 1707)
5. Entry of the Boyars by Johan Halvorsen (1864 - 1935)
6. Omnia computatus est by Vladimir Ussachevsky (1911 - 1990)
