= Noise regulation =

Noise control by legal regulation of noise-producing items

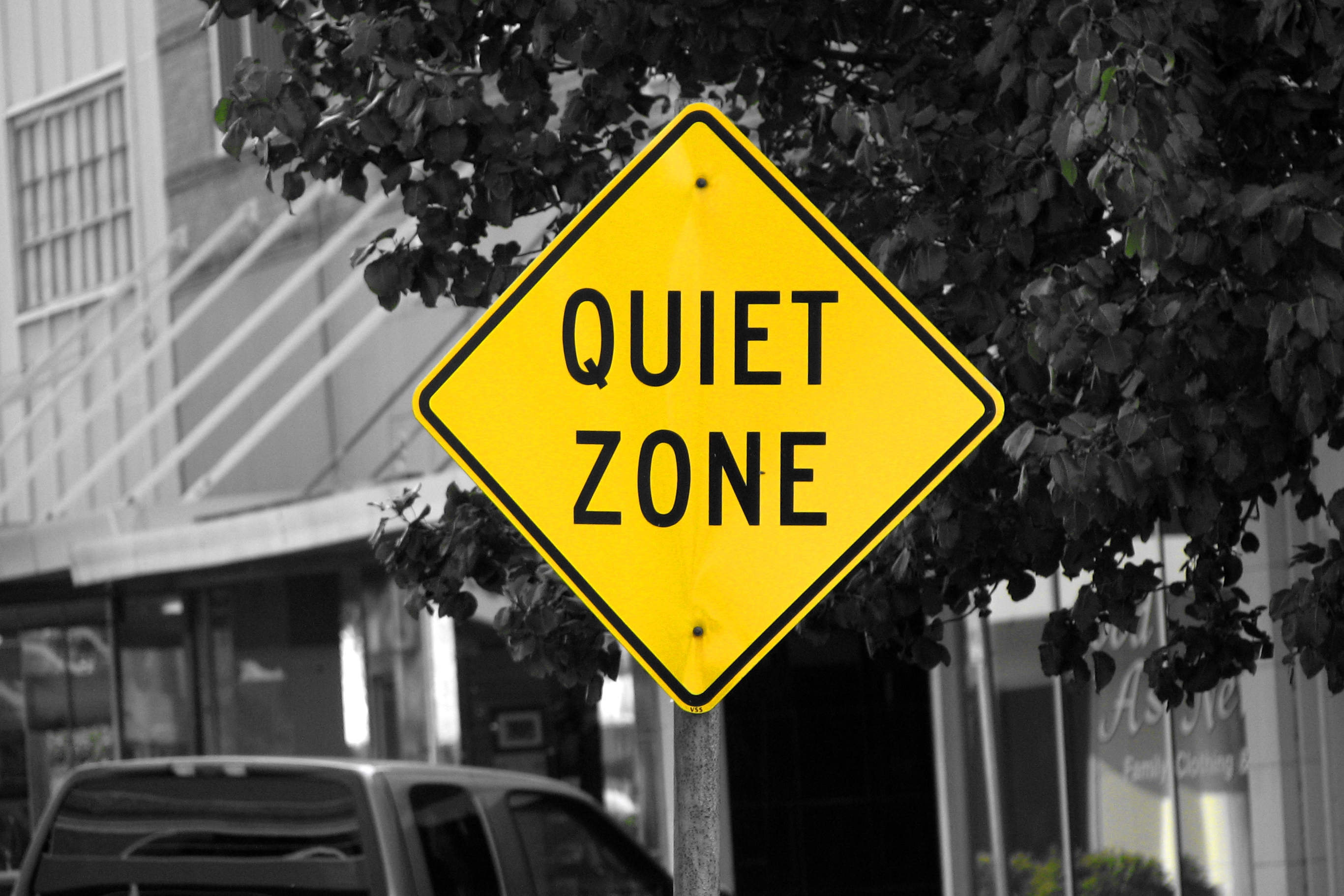
A "quiet zone" sign, indicating that "no person operating any vehicle within the zone shall sound the horn or other warning device of the vehicle, except in an emergency"

Noise regulation includes statutes or guidelines relating to sound transmission established by national, state or provincial and municipal levels of government. After the watershed passage of the United States Noise Control Act of 1972, other local and state governments passed further regulations.

A noise regulation restricts the amount of noise, the duration of noise and the source of noise. It usually places restrictions for certain times of the day.

Although the United Kingdom and Japan enacted national laws in 1960 and 1967 respectively, these laws were not at all comprehensive or fully enforceable to address generally rising ambient noise, enforceable numerical source limits on aircraft and motor vehicles or comprehensive directives to local government. Greece's Police Order 3 (1996) established common quiet hours from 15:00 to 17:30 and from 23:00 to 07:00 in the summer season and 15:30 to 17:30 and from 22:00 until 07:30.

Quiet hours are times during a day or night when there are placed tighter restrictions on unnecessary or bothersome noise. They vary between jurisdictions and areas, but are typically in place during night-time, so as not to interfere with residents sleep. Some noise measurement standards which takes into account different times of the day are the American day-night average sound level (Ldn) standard or the European day–evening–night noise level (L_{den}) standard. Some jurisdictions also have wider noise restrictions on weekends or on certain public holidays. Industrial or nightlife areas may be exempt or have fewer restrictions, while private institutions, hotels and universities may place additional restrictions on their guests.

== History ==
=== United States initial legislation ===
In the 1960s and earlier, few people recognized that citizens might be entitled to be protected from adverse sound level exposure. Most concerted actions consisted of citizens groups organized to oppose a specific highway or airport, and occasionally a nuisance lawsuit would arise. Things in the United States changed rapidly with passage of the National Environmental Policy Act (NEPA) in 1969 and the Noise Pollution and Abatement Act, more commonly called the Noise Control Act (NCA), in 1972. Passage of the NCA was remarkable considering the lack of historic organized citizen concern. However, the United States Environmental Protection Agency (EPA) had testified before Congress that 30 million Americans are exposed to non-occupational noise high enough to cause hearing loss and 44 million Americans live in homes impacted by aircraft or highway noise.

NEPA requires all federally funded major actions to be analyzed for all physical environmental impacts including noise pollution, and the NCA directed the EPA to promulgate regulations for a host of noise emissions. Many city ordinances prohibit sound above a threshold intensity from trespassing over property line at night, typically between 9 p.m. and 7 a.m., and during the day restricts it to a higher sound level; however, enforcement is uneven. Many municipalities do not follow up on complaints. Even where a municipality has an enforcement office, it may only be willing to issue warnings, since taking offenders to court is expensive. A notable exception to this rule is the City of Portland, Oregon, which has instituted aggressive protection for its citizens with fines reaching as high as $5000 per infraction, with the ability to cite a responsible noise violator multiple times in a single day.

Under the Occupational Safety and Health Act of 1970, employers are responsible for providing safe and healthful workplaces for their employees. OSHA's role is to ensure these conditions for America's working men and women by setting and enforcing standards, and providing training, education and assistance. The same Act charges the National Institute for Occupational Safety and Health (NIOSH) with recommending occupational safety and health standards. NIOSH communicates these recommended standards to regulatory agencies (including OSHA) and to others in the occupational safety and health community through the publication and dissemination of Criteria Documents such as the Criteria for A Recommended Standard - Occupational Noise Exposure.

=== Follow-up on initial U.S. laws ===
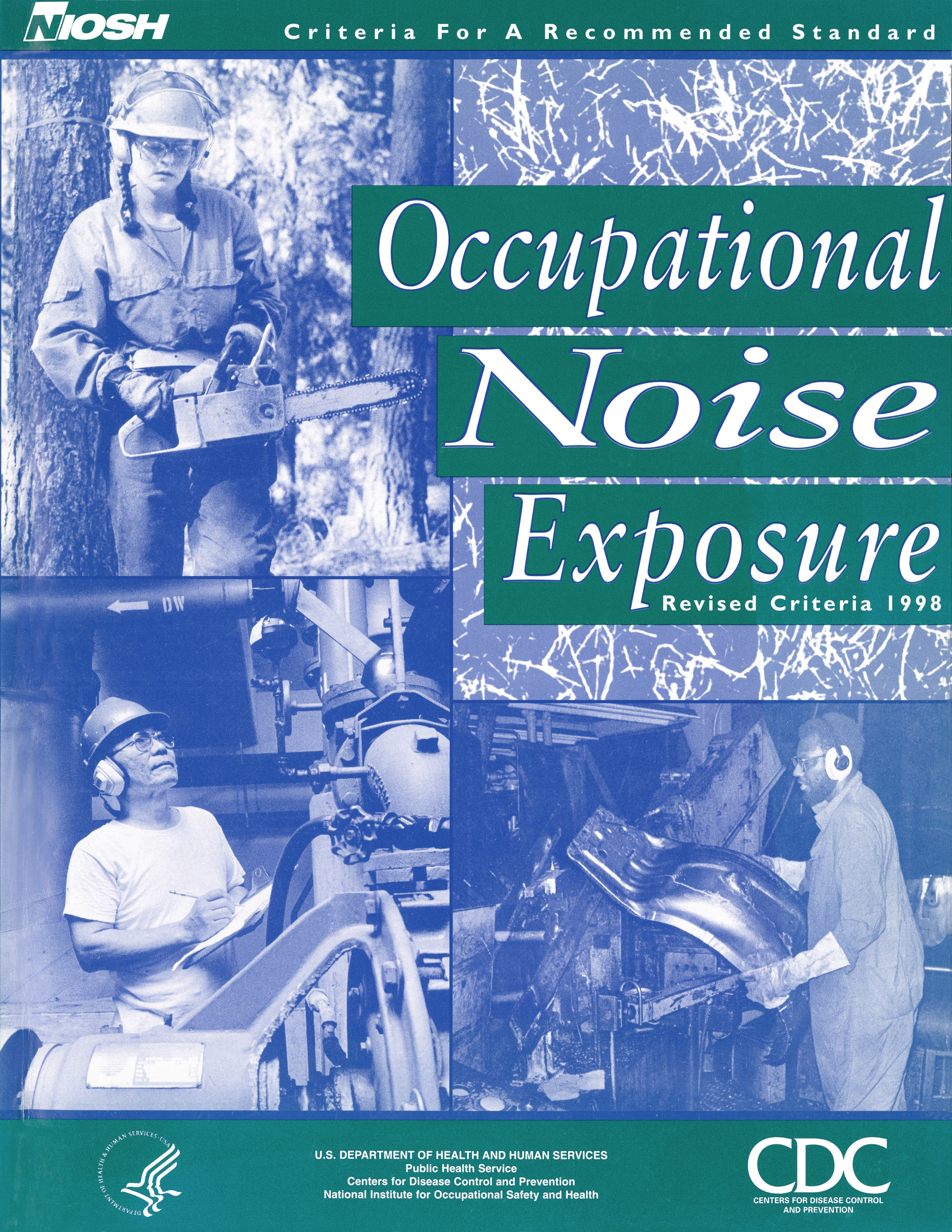
1998 NIOSH Criteria for A Recommended Standard - Occupational Noise Exposure

Initially these laws had a significant effect on thoughtful study of transportation programs and also federally funded housing programs in the United States. They also gave states and cities an impetus to consider environmental noise in their planning and zoning decisions, and led to a host of statutes below the federal level. Awareness of the need for noise control was rising. In fact, by 1973 a national poll of 60,000 U.S. residents found that sixty percent of people considered street noise to have a "disturbing, harmful or dangerous" impact.

This trend continued strongly throughout the 1970s in the U.S., with about half of the states and hundreds of cities passing substantive noise control laws. The EPA coordinated all federal noise control activities through its Office of Noise Abatement and Control. The EPA phased out the office's funding in 1982 as part of a shift in federal noise control policy to transfer the primary responsibility of regulating noise to state and local governments. However, the Noise Control Act of 1972 and the Quiet Communities Act of 1978 were never rescinded by Congress and remain in effect today, although essentially unfunded.

The Federal Aviation Administration (FAA) regulates aircraft noise by specifying the maximum noise level that individual civil aircraft can emit through requiring aircraft to meet certain noise certification standards. These standards designate changes in maximum noise level requirements by "stage" designation. The U.S. noise standards are defined in the Code of Federal Regulations (CFR) Title 14 Part 36 – Noise Standards: Aircraft Type and Airworthiness Certification (14 CFR Part 36). The FAA also pursues a program of aircraft noise control in cooperation with the aviation community.

The Federal Highway Administration (FHWA) developed noise regulations to control highway noise as required by the Federal-Aid Highway Act of 1970. The regulations requires promulgation of traffic noise-level criteria for various land use activities, and describe procedures for the abatement of highway traffic noise and construction noise.

Nevertheless, some states continued to act. California carried out an ambitious plan to require its cities to establish a "Noise Element of the General Plan," which provides guidance for land planning decisions to minimize noise impacts on the public. Many cities throughout the U.S. also have noise ordinances, which specifies the allowable sound level that can cross property lines. These ordinances can be enforced with local police powers.

=== Japan ===
Japan actually passed the first national noise control act, but its scope was much more limited than the U.S. law, addressing mainly workplace and construction noise.

=== Europe and Asia ===
Several European countries emulated the U.S. national noise control law: Netherlands (1979), France (1985), Spain (1993), and Denmark (1994). In some cases unlegislated innovations have led to quieter products exceeding legal mandates (for example, hybrid vehicles or direct drive (belt less) technology in washing machines).

Environmental noise is a special definition in the European Environmental Noise Directive 2002/49/EC article 10.1. The Noise Emission by Equipment Used Outdoors Directive 20014/EC further places upper limits on noise of 57 types of outdoor equipment that may cause environmental noise pollution.

== Local noise ordinances in U.S. and Europe ==
Local ordinances are principally aimed at construction noise, power equipment operated by individuals and unmuffled industrial noise penetrating residential areas. Thousands of U.S. cities have prepared noise ordinances that give noise control officers and police the power to investigate noise complaints and enforcement power to abate the offending noise source, through shutdowns and fines. In the 1970s and early 1980s there was a professional association for noise enforcement officers called NANCO, "National Association of Noise Control Officials."

Today only a handful of properly trained Noise Control Officers remain in the United States. A typical noise ordinance sets forth clear definitions of acoustic nomenclature and defines categories of noise generation; then numerical standards are established, so that enforcement personnel can take the necessary steps of warnings, fines or other municipal police power to rectify unacceptable noise generation. Ordinances have achieved certain successes but they can be thorny to implement. Many European cities are still treating noise as the U.S. did in the 1960s, as a nuisance and not as a numerical standard to be achieved.

- Effects of Noise on Health and Welfare

One obligation of a community is to protect its citizens from adverse environmental influences. Noise is one of these factors. Noise has documented effects on people; they can be divided into three types. The first type is a physical effect that directly and adversely affects a person's health. Hearing loss and vibration of bodily components are examples. The second type is a physiological effect that adversely affects a person's health; heightened blood pressure and general stress response are examples. The third type is psychological and adversely affects a person's welfare; examples are distraction, annoyance, and complaint. The only feasible legal basis for a community's right to control noise is based on these adverse health and welfare effects. It is clearly easier to uphold the constitutionality of a noise ordinance in a court of law if it can be shown that it is based on health and welfare concerns. The following is a short list of recognized effects of noise that can be addressed as a reason for a noise ordinance.

Excess non-Occupational noise exposure, hearing loss on both public and private property, speech interference on both public and private property, audio interference on both public and private property, and sleep interference on mostly private property.

=== Some legal considerations in the United States ===
Several fundamental issues shape the legality, effectiveness and enforceability of any community noise regulation.

==== Preemption ====
The federal government has preempted certain areas of noise regulation. They can be found in the Code of Federal Regulations under the EPA Noise Abatement Programs; Parts 201 to 205 and 211 cover railroads, motor carriers in interstate commerce, construction equipment, and motor vehicles. They require product labeling and prohibit tampering with noise control devices. Communities may enact regulations that are no more strict than the federal ones so that local enforcement can be carried out. They can enact curfews and restrict vehicle use in established zones such as residential. Any restriction on interstate motor carriers or railroads may NOT be for the purpose of noise control. States have police powers granted by the Constitution. They may also enact regulations that are no more strict than federal regulations. They may also preempt local ordinances. California and New Jersey have comprehensive noise codes that communities must meet. Many states required that local ordinances be no more strict than the state code whether such code exists or not. One relatively common preemption is protection of shooting ranges from noise regulation or litigation and right-to-farm laws that protect agricultural areas from nuisance litigation by encroaching residential areas.

==== Constitutional vagueness ====
In one state court case, the court declared that numerical sound levels were constitutional as not void for vagueness, as the term plainly audible provided it was associated with a reasonable distance. Two requirements for a noise ordinance provision is that:

1. provide fair warning
2. avoid the possibility of arbitrary enforcement

==== Overbreadth ====
In one Supreme Court case the court ruled that the specificity of the city ordinance regulating school verbal protests was not constitutionally vague, gave fair warning, and was not an invitation to arbitrary enforcement and so was not overbroad, despite the implied limitation on free speech.

==== Nuisance ====
Nuisance law applies to both community noise regulation as well as private suits brought to court to reduce noise impact.

==== Enforceability ====
Care must be taken in writing a subjective noise provision so that it overcomes the objections listed above. Care must be taken when writing an objective noise provision to make sure that the sound levels are physically realizable. For example, requiring the maximum sound level of an automobile to be 40 dB(A) or the maximum sound level in a residential zone to be 30 dB(A) opens the provision to an enforceability challenge.

=== Four types of noise regulation ===
Fixed sound sources must be treated differently than moving sources. In the former case, the listener is normally defined while for moving sources it is not. Historically, regulations were enforced by the subjective judgment of an enforcing officer. With the advent of sound measuring equipment, the judgment can be based on measured sound levels. Most comprehensive noise ordinances contain four types of provisions.

Subjective Emission
These regulations allow an official to decide if the output of a sound source is acceptable without recourse to sound measurements and without regard to the presence of a specific listener. Regulations with plainly audible terms on public property as a criterion are examples.
Subjective Immission
These regulations allow an official to decide if the sound received by a listener is acceptable without recourse to sound measurements and without regard for the specific sound power generated by the source. Regulations with plainly audible or noise disturbance terms on private property as a criterion are examples.
Objective Emission
These regulations require an official to measure the output of a sound source to determine whether it is acceptable without regard to the presence of a specific listener. Regulations with specific maximum sound output levels for motor vehicles are examples.
Objective Immission
These regulations require an official to measure the sound received by a listener to determine whether it is acceptable without regard to the specific sound power generated by the source. Regulations with maximum allowable sound levels on property lines are examples

=== Some definitions used in the United States ===
Many communities have definitions that are local to them, such as those defining motor vehicles and sound levels and sound level measurements. Some that have been added to make noise enforcement more specific are listed here.

==== Engine braking device ====
A compression braking device installed on large motor vehicles to assist in reduction, or control, of vehicle speed. When activated, the engine converts from a power source to a power absorber by converting the engine into an air compressor.

==== Muffler ====
Any device for the abatement of sound emission while permitting the transfer of gas. A muffler is considered to be in good working order if the sound reduction is equal to, or greater than, that of the original equipment.

==== Noise disturbance ====
Any sound or vibration which:

1. may disturb or annoy reasonable persons of normal sensitivities or;
2. causes, or tends to cause, an adverse effect on the public health and welfare or;
3. endangers or injures people or;
4. endangers or injures personal or real property.

This can also be defined as noise nuisance.

==== Place of public entertainment ====
Any location, exterior or interior, of a building that regularly permits public entrance for entertainment purposes. For this purpose, "public" means citizens of all types, including but not limited to children and private or public employees.

==== Plainly audible sound ====
Any sound for which the information content is unambiguously communicated to the listener, such as, but not limited to, understandable speech, comprehension of whether a voice is raised or normal, repetitive bass sounds, or comprehension of musical rhythms, without the aid of any listening device.

==== Powered model vehicle ====
Any self-propelled airborne, water-borne, or land-borne plane, vessel, or vehicle, which is not designed to carry persons, including, but not limited to, any model airplane, boat, car, or rocket.

==== Real property boundary ====
An imaginary line along the ground surface, and its vertical extension, which separates the real property owned by one person from that owned by another person, but not including intra-building real property divisions.

==== Sound reproduction device ====
Any device, instrument, mechanism, equipment or apparatus for the amplification of any sounds from any radio, phonograph, stereo, tape player, musical instrument, television, loudspeaker or other sound-making or sound-producing device or any device or apparatus for the reproduction or amplification of the human voice or other sound.

==== Vibration perception threshold ====
The minimum ground or structure-borne vibrational motion necessary to cause a person of normal sensitivity to be aware of the motion through contact, hearing, or through visual observation of moving things.

=== Ordinance provisions for stationary sources in the United States ===
There are three levels of regulation for stationary sound sources. The most basic is the general one associated with noise disturbance. (See Noise Disturbance below.) It is a very broad subjective immission control that has evolved from earlier disturbance of the peace provisions. Subjectivity can lead to arbitrary enforcement. The next level of regulation is less broad; it is an objective immission control that uses specific levels of sound considered to be a noise disturbance. Arbitrary enforcement is reduced. (See Maximum Permissible Sound Levels below.) In both cases, however, the person creating the sound may not be aware that his actions are in violation. The concept that a potential violator should have fair warning that his actions are in violation has led to provisions that address specific noise problems. The sections below list those that are found in community noise ordinances.

==== Air conditioning, heating and pool equipment ====
This provision is a subjective immission control. An evaluation of the noise disturbance is made at the listener without a sound level meter. This provision is mostly applied in residential zones such as homes, apartments and condominiums. Albuquerque, NM (Article 9-9) requires that such units meet the maximum permissible sound levels (see section below) and recommend that those units be placed away from other residential units or on rooftops to diminish impact.

==== Airport and airport operations ====
Community control of airport-created noise is limited to those sounds not related to flight operations. The community can control the land use around the airport however.

==== Animals ====
This provision is a subjective immission control. Most relate to barking dogs and put an upper time limit for continuous sound from them. New Jersey (Chapter 13:1G) considers a violation if the sound is continuous for more than 5 minutes or intermittent for more than 20 minutes. They also consider it a defense to a violation if the animal is provoked to bark. Connecticut (Chapter 442) exempts animal sounds while Anchorage, AK (Chapter 15.70) requires that continual violations permit the animal to be taken and put out for adoption.

==== Authorized outdoor discharge of firearms and shooting ranges ====
This provision contains only a curfew since most states protect shooting ranges from liability for noise disturbance. It can include a curfew requirement and a requirement for a public hearing if expansion of the range is desired. The provision may prohibit other weapons such as rocket-propelled projectiles but may exempt unpowered weapons such as arrows. South Carolina (title 31 Chapter 18) requires that a sign stating SHOOTING RANGE-NOISE AREA be placed on all primary roads. Arizona (ARS 17-602) places a curfew from 10 pm to 7 am. It also allows a tradeoff between the number of events and the maximum permitted sound level. New York (Chapter 150) also trades off overall levels with the duration of the sounds. Colorado (Article 25-12-109) declared that noise restrictions on shooting ranges is a detriment to public health, welfare, and morale.

==== Condominiums and apartments ====
This provision is a subjective immission control. It is designed to limit the noise disturbance between living units as defined by an enforcement official. One criterion used to evaluate that disturbance is use of plainly audible but at the location of the listener instead of at a specific distance. However, Charlotte, NC (Sec. 15-69) limits indoor levels to 55 dB(A) between 9 am and 9 pm and 5 dB less at other times, but only from sound reproducing devices. Salt Lake Valley Health Department (Chapter 4), Minneapolis, MN (Chapter 389), and Albuquerque, NM (Article 9) use levels relative to existing ambient to define a violation. Albuquerque NM and Omaha, NE (Chapter 17) require that intruding sounds not be audible. Burlington, VT (Chapter 18) requires that renters be supplied with the city noise ordinance.

In New York City specifically, the neighbor-to-neighbor noise issue is predominantly based on the average living situation. Due to the fact that most residents either live above, below, or directly next to their neighbors NYC building codes require the "acoustical isolation of dwelling units." Through the use of thick concrete walls or flooring to make sure the condo or cooperative is able to pass a warranty of habitability each unit must be able to withstand a certain amount of noise.

==== Construction ====
This provision can be both a subjective immission control and an objective emission control. Normally there are daily curfews and in some cases weekend curfews. The subjective aspect is to prevent noise disturbance in the adjacent community. The objective aspect is to control the sound output of specific machines. There are four major sources of site noise: (1) direct sound from continually operating equipment such as air compressors; (2) intermittent sound from equipment such as jack hammers;(3) backup alarms; and (4) hauling equipment such as trucks. Air compressor noise is regulated by CFR 204 and backup alarms are regulated by CFR 1926. Boston, MA(Section 16–26.4) permits construction on weekdays between 7 am and 6 pm. Madison, WI (Chapter 24.08) limits sound levels to 88 dB(A) at 50 Feet. Miami, FL (Section 36-6) considers the noise a noise disturbance if it occurs between 6 pm and 8 am during the week and any time on Sunday. Dallas, TX (Section 30-2 (9)) permits construction in residential zones from 7 am to 7 pm on weekdays, from 9 am to 7 pm on Saturdays and Holidays, and prohibits construction on Sundays. Albuquerque, New Mexico (Section 9-9-8) has a more complex control. It prohibits construction and demolition within 500 feet of noise-sensitive properties (residences included) if the equipment sound control devices are less effective than the original equipment and if noise mitigation measures are not used when the levels exceed 90 dB (weighting not specified) or more than 80 dB during the day for three days.

==== Domestic and commercial power tools ====
This provision is a subjective immission control with a curfew. It is used in residential zones as well as in commercial areas abutting residential zones. Portland, OR (Title 18.10.030) has several ways to handle these tools. They separate outdoor and indoor use to different maximum levels at the property line. They have a night curfew and separate 5 HP tools from higher-powered tools. Madison WI (Chapter 24.08) has similar HP restrictions. Albuquerque, NM (Title 9-9-7) restricts locations to more than 500 feet from residential and noise-sensitive zones. Dallas, TX(Sec. 30-2) exempts lawn maintenance tools during daylight hours. Green Bay, WI (Subchapter II – 27.201) exempts snow removal tools.

==== Explosives, firearms, impulsive sources, and similar devices ====
This provision is a subjective immission control with a curfew. It is for impulsive sound sources that are not associated with construction activities or shooting ranges. Many communities use the Maximum Permissible Sound Levels criterion (see below), with a correction for the character of the sound. Illinois () sets maximum blasting levels by land use zone and in three time categories. Portland, OR (Section 18.10.010.F) limits levels to 100 dB (peak) from 7 am to 10 pm and 80 dB (peak) from 10 pm to 7 am.

==== Fracking operations ====
Hydraulic Fracturing operations generate site sound as well as vehicle sound and several different provisions are required to control it. Federal law regulates the levels of certain site machinery. A subjective immission control or an objective immission control can be applied to surrounding neighborhoods. See maximum Permissible Sound Levels. Motor vehicle sound is mostly off-site so vehicle noise regulations are applicable. See Motor Vehicles on a Public Right-of-way. The State of New York has announced a statewide ban on such operations. Buffalo, NY and Pittsburgh, PA have announced a ban. Colorado has numerous activities to stop fracking.

==== Funerals ====
This is a subjective emission control to reduce the excessive shouting and protests that can surround funeral proceedings. It makes use of the plainly audible term and so adds a distance criterion. There are certain groups, particularly those that object to involvement in foreign wars, who believe it is an obligation to disrupt and picket funerals, especially those of deceased military veterans. This provision must not infringe on constitutionally protected free speech. Illinois h(720 ILCS 5/26 6) has a comprehensive provision covering more aspects of this event than noise. They failed to use "plainly audible" which is narrower than "audible". Utah (Section 76-9-108) restricts disruptive activity to beyond 200 feet.

==== Loading and unloading operations ====
This provision is a subjective immission control with a curfew. Operations in commercial facilities can impact adjacent residential zones. Los Angeles, CA (Section 114.03) places a curfew on such operations between 10 p.m. and 7 a.m. but only if the source is within 200 feet of a residence. Chicago, IL (Section 11-4-2830) permits night operations unless they create a noise disturbance. Hammond, IN (Section 6.2.6) prohibits noise disturbance between 7 p.m. and 7 a.m.

==== Maximum permissible sound pressure levels ====
This provision is an objective immission control. It requires the measurement of sound levels at or beyond a property line and its vertical extension. There are several methods for implementing such a provision:

1. It may not permit any exceedance or may permit exceedance only for a percentage of the measurement period.
2. It may require the measurement method to be instantaneous, such as dB(A) or time-averaged, such as Energy Equivalent Level (Leq).
3. It may be a fixed level limit, such as 55 dB(A), or it may be a level relative to the ambient sound, such as 5 dB(A) above the ambient.
4. It may require measurement of the frequency spectrum, such as one-octave bands, or A-weighting, such as dB(A).
5. It may define different maximum levels based on zoning criteria, such as residential, commercial, or industrial.
6. It may define different maximum levels based on time-of-day or day-of-week, such as reduced maxima during night hours or on weekends.
7. It may require reduction of maximum levels based on the character of the sound, such as intermittent or impulsive.
8. It may exempt certain classes of sound sources, such as shooting ranges, farm equipment, emergency equipment, railroads, or licensed activities.

Most noise ordinances set maximum levels for two time periods: Day (7 a.m. to 10 p.m.) and Night (10 p.m. to 7 a.m.). San Diego (Article 9.25) sets three periods: Day (7 a.m. to 7 p.m.), Evening (7 p.m. to 10 p.m.), and Night (10 p.m. to 7 a.m.) and exempts industrial zones from time based restrictions. Seattle, WA (Chapter 25.08) sets two time periods but changes 7 a.m. to 9 a.m. on weekends and holidays. Several states have maximum permissible land use sound levels in dB(A). Most have Day and Night periods and three use categories: residential, Commercial and Industrial. Washington (Chapter 70.107) sets maximum levels in dB(A) but allows 5 dB(A) more if the sound is only 15 minutes in an hour, or 10 dB(A) for 5 minutes in an hour. Numerous cities have fixed levels, permitting excess levels for short times (e.g., Dallas, TX, Chapter 30) while others use Leq (Lincoln, NE, Chapter 8.24). Los Angeles, CA (Chapter XI) uses a relative level with a stated but presumed ambient. New York City, NY (Chapter 19) requires Leq measurements to be made over one hour. Atlanta, GA () limits impulsive sound to 100 dB(C) at property lines, while most reduce the maximum level by 5 dB for pure tones and impulsive sounds.

==== Motor vehicle or motorboat repairs and testing ====
This provision is a subjective immission control with a curfew. If the activity is done in a residential zone, the Domestic Tools provision can be applied for the repairs, but this provision also is used for the testing phase of any repairs. Los Angeles, CA (Section 114.01) covers this violation in three ways. The first is application of the noise disturbance provision in residential districts between the hours of 8 pm and 8 am. The second is being plainly audible at a distance of 150 feet or more in residential districts between the hours of 8 pm and 8 am. The third is exceeding the presumed ambient by 5 dB. Hammond, IN (Section 6.2.7) prohibits this activity as a noise disturbance at any time.

==== Noise disturbance prohibited ====
This provision is a subjective immission control. This provision is generic in that it covers all events that are considered disturbing by a listener, with or without measurement. The strength of this provision is that it covers situations not contemplated in a noise ordinance and can be used as backup for more specific provisions. The weakness is that it may not give fair warning, may lead to arbitrary enforcement on the part of the regulator, or permit unreasonable demands by a listener.

==== Noise sensitive zones ====
This provision is a subjective immission control. It is used to reduce levels of both stationary and vehicular sound sources around hospitals, schools, and other noise sensitive locations. To provide fair warning visible signs must be posted. It is possible to have an extensive list. For example, if churches are on the list and the community has many of them, signage, compliance, and enforcement can be a problem. In modern hospital environments, helicopter sound is exempt.

==== Places of public entertainment ====
This provision is an objective immission control. It regulates the site of the sound source while the Sound Reproduction Devices section regulates the devices that create the sound. It can regulate the sound levels received by involuntary listeners in the surrounding community as well as the sound levels received by voluntary listeners. If the latter aspect is incorporated, limiting internal sound levels often resolves community noise impact. Los Angeles (Article 2, Section 112.06)requires warning signs and limits noise exposure to 95 dB(A) at any position normally occupied. Seattle, WA {Section 25.08.501} considers the sound emitted to be in violation if the sound is plainly audible within a dwelling from 10 pm to 7am; the need for a sound level meter is avoided. Chicago, IL {Section 11-4-2805} limits received sound levels to 55 dB(A) inside a residential dwelling unit but if the ambient is greater, the limit is 65 dB(A). If outdoors, the limit is conversational level at 100 feet from the property line. If the building is set back 20 feet from the property line, the allowable level is 84 dB(A)! Both of Chicago's limits apply from 10 pm to 8 am. Salt Lake health Department, UT {Section 4.5.11.(vii)} sets the limit at 95 dB(A) at a position that would normally be occupied by a patron and 100 dB(A) at other positions. They also require a sign stating WARNING: SOUND LEVELS ON THIS PREMISE [sic] MAY CAUSE PERMANENT HEARING DAMAGE. HEARING PROTECTION IS AVAILABLE. Anchorage, AK (Section 15.70.060.B.12) sets maximum levels for any patron at 90 dB(A).

==== Powered unmanned vehicles or engines ====
This provision is a subjective immission control with a curfew. It has been used to regulate the sound of model aircraft on both private and public property. It applies to airborne, water-borne, and land-borne unmanned vehicles. It makes no distinction between model vehicles and full-size unmanned vehicles. It also applies to the engines of those vehicles. Most regulations pertained to private unmanned vehicles, normally restricted to local open fields. The development of drones with microphones, cameras and GPS has opened the door to commercial use over wider private and public properties. Since federal preemption of drone use will likely occur, it is important for this provision to make the distinction. Salt Lake Health Department (Section 4.5.15) limits activity to 800 feet from a dwelling between 10 pm and 7 am, or if it causes a noise disturbance. Atlanta, GA (Section 74-136(b)) uses the plainly audible criterion across a residential property line, on public property from 10 p.m. to 7 a.m. on weekdays or from 10 p.m. to 10 a.m. on weekends or holidays for any sound source.

==== Propane cannons ====
This provision is a subjective immission control with a curfew. A propane cannon is used to keep animals and birds from destroying commercial crops. In large fields, many are used and fired at frequent intervals. The sound levels are equivalent to the firing of a small artillery cannon. The provision may contain requirements that limit the number of cannons permitted in a specific area and the number of firings per hour for each cannon. Many US states have a Right to Farm Act that limits nuisance litigation. Florida stated that it was a purpose of their act to protect reasonable agricultural activities conducted on farmland from nuisance suits. They also added a section that limited expansion of operations without consideration of noise. Fairfax County, VA (Sections 105-4-4 and 108-5-1) require agricultural operation to meet maximum land use regulations and prohibit unnecessary noise. British Columbia Ministry of Agriculture (Farm Nuisance Noise document) have developed a comprehensive set of rules for cannon use.

==== Public address systems ====
This provision is a subjective immission control. It can contain a plainly audible term or a curfew. It is applied to commercial facilities using a sound system to deliberately propagate mostly speech, but also music. Most cities have provisions relevant to this subject. Lakewood, CO (Sections 9.52.06 and 09.52.160) uses plainly audible as a regulatory tool and prohibits the sounding of bells or chimes from 10 pm to 7 am. Charlotte, NC (Section 15-69(a)(4)) limits levels to 60 dB(A) at 50 feet from 9 am to 9 pm and 50 dB(A) at other times. Indianapolis, IN (Section 391-505) addresses broadcasts from aircraft. Connecticut (Section 22a-69-1.7) exempts bells, carillons, and chimes from religious facilities.

==== Sound reproduction devices ====
This provision is subjective immission control. It may contain a numerical level or a plainly audible term and a curfew. It is applied to specific sources of sound as opposed to any location at which the sound is created. It is applied primarily to amplified sound sources. Older provisions listed several items such as televisions, phonographs, etc. Changing the title to the above addresses the real issue and allows for novel sound production devices. Numerous communities have provisions for these devices; many use plainly audible as the criterion, such as Omaha, NE (Section 17-3) and Buffalo NY (Section 293-4)

==== Stadiums and outdoor music festivals ====
This provision can be either a subjective or objective immission control with a curfew. The subjective aspect relates to noise disturbance in the local community. The objective aspect limits the acceptable sound level in the local community. Illinois (Environmental Protection Act 415.25) exempts certain stadiums and exempts festivals, parades, or street fairs. Colorado Spring, CO (Section 9.8.101) has similar exemptions, but limits the sound levels to 80 dB(A) at residential locations.

==== Stationary emergency signaling devices ====
This provision is an emission control with a list of devices that are exempt. It can have a term that limits the time periods in which emergency alarms may be tested. It can have a term that limits the activation time of burglar or fire alarms. Chicago, IL (Section 11-4-2815) limits the time for tests to 4 minutes between 9 am and 5 pm. Oregon (Chapter 467) prohibits sound when an emergency vehicle is stationary.

==== Stationary non-emergency non-safety signaling devices ====
This provision is an emission control that limits the activation period of alarms and restricts activation to a specific time-of-day or day-of-week. Los Angeles, CA () prohibits the sounding if the signal can be heard at 200 feet or more. Chicago, IL (Section 11-4-2820) considers the sound to be a noise disturbance in residential areas if the sound exceeds 5 minutes in any hour; steam whistles are exempt. Albuquerque, NM (Section 9-9-12) restricts levels to 5 dB over the ambient at a property line and applies maximum permissible residential level as well as plainly audible restrictions at night.

==== Street sales ====
This provision is a subjective immission control with a curfew. Boston, MA (Section 16–2.2) prohibits street sales near schools or churches if there is a “disturbance of the peace”. Hammond, IN (Section 6.2.4) places a curfew between 6 p.m. and 9 a.m.

==== Tampering ====
This provision prevents the modification of muffling devices that increase the emitted sound. It can also be used to prevent the commercial sale of such mufflers. Most states and communities have prohibitions on tampering with noise reduction devices. Whether stationary or moving. Salt Lake County health Department (Section 4.5.10) prohibits modifications of mufflers that increase sound levels and prohibits tampering with noise rating labels. See Section below on Adequate Mufflers.

==== Vibration ====
This provision is a subjective emission control. Noise disturbance caused by vibration comes in three forms. One is contact with vibrating surfaces, the second is auditory, and the third is the observation of surrounding objects' movement. Objectively regulating vibration is difficult so this provision makes use of the Vibration Perception Threshold. Railroad-caused vibration is preempted by federal law (CFR 201). Chicago, IL (Section 11-4-2910) uses the perception threshold method. Dallas, TX requires measurement of low frequency vibration. Maryland uses the definition of noise to include sound and vibration at sub-audible frequencies.

==== Wind turbines ====
The sound created by wind turbines is caused by the blade rotation similar to aircraft propellers. Because the rotation rate is low, the frequency is also low, but the large size of many can result in disturbing sound levels, particularly in high wind areas. Most local control is done by advantageous site planning. New Hampshire (Title LXIV, Section 674:63) sets a sound level limit of 55 dB when measured at the site property line, allowing for exceptional events, such as storms. Studies have declared that wind noise can have a negative effect on health.

=== Ordinance provisions for moving vehicles in the United States ===
Stationary sources have fixed positions, so it is possible to define the listeners and therefore immission controls are appropriate. Motor vehicles are moving sources so it is not possible to define any specific listeners so emission controls are appropriate. There are exceptions to this distinction. Construction equipment, and some recreation vehicles, move within a bounded area and can be considered to be time varying fixed sources. Standing motor vehicles can radiate sufficient sound to create noise disturbance. These must be treated by specific provisions.

==== Adequate mufflers or sound dissipation devices ====
This provision is an objective emission control. Unlike the Tampering provision, this is specific to motor vehicles. It requires that a vehicle muffler not create more sound than the original equipment which has been measured. It prohibits any modification or replacement that increases the sound emission beyond that of the original equipment. It prohibits the sale of mufflers that do not meet original equipment standards. Many states have requirements that a muffler shall be in good working order which is not specific enough. California (Section 27150.1) requires that a retail seller that sells a product in violation of the muffler regulation must install a replacement muffler that meets the regulation and must reimburse the purchaser for the expense of replacement.

==== Airboats and hovercraft ====
This provision is both an objective emission control and a subjective immission control. It can set a maximum sound level at a specified distance (typically 50 feet). It can have a curfew. It can be based on noise disturbance in the community. It can also require the use of ear protectors on passengers. Unlike motorboats, the sound generators on these vehicles are airborne, resulting in more noise impact. Florida (Section 327.65) requires a maximum level of 90 DB(A). Maine (Title 12 Section 13068-A)has three levels: operating, operating test and stationary test

==== Engine braking devices ====
This provision is an emission control. It can restrict brake use for only safety purposes and by defining restricted areas. It can require that mufflers be maintained to keep emitted sound to that of the original equipment. Common terminology is Jake brakes after the Jacobs Company. Milwaukee, Wi (Section 80-69) prohibits use within city limits. Portland, OR (Section 18.10.020.B.3) prohibits use within 200 feet of a residence. Albuquerque, NM posts signs requiring proper mufflers.

==== Motorboats ====
This provision is both an objective emission control and a subjective immission control. Because they are moving sources, objective controls are appropriate for measurements on open waterways. Many motorboats operate in bounding areas, such as small lakes or canals, with adjacent residential areas. In this case, immission controls are appropriate. California (Section 654.05), Portland OR (Section 18.10.040), and Seattle, WA (Section 25.08.485) require immission measurements to be made at the shoreline. Many states require emission measurements to be made at 50 feet.

==== Motor vehicle horns or signaling devices ====
This provision is both a prohibition and an emission control. It limits use for safety warning only. It limits the sound level to a specific level at a prescribed distance. This provision is intended to limit horn use to safety and to limit the use of excessively loud air horns or Rumbler or Howler horns. California prohibits a person operating a motor vehicle from wearing a headset or earplugs on both ears. Oregon (Section 820.370) prohibits signaling sound when an emergency vehicle is stationary or returning from an emergency

==== Motor vehicles on a public right-of-way ====
This provision is an objective emission control. It applies maximum sound levels to various categories of moving vehicles and for several vehicle speeds. It is the backbone of vehicle sound emission regulations. It generally requires a measurement of A-weighted sound level of a moving vehicle at a specific distance from the vehicle path (normally 50 feet). This provision has level restrictions on trucks over 10,000 GVW used locally and in interstate commerce. It also covers motorcycles of two horsepower ratings, mopeds, and all other vehicles on public rights-of-way. The federal government has set maximum levels for heavy trucks used in interstate commerce (40 CFR 202)and for motorcycles (40 CFR 205). Most states and many cities have maximum limits and they generally agree with federal standards where they apply. The most common speed division is 35 mph.

==== Motor vehicle racing events ====
This provision is an objective emission control. It can define the method of vehicle operation that is used to define the maximum permitted sound level. It can have a curfew. Some states exempt motor vehicle racing events from noise disturbance litigation or prosecution. Arizona (Section 28-955.03) exempts racing motorcycles from maximum sound levels and muffler requirements. Illinois {Section 35.903} had detailed regulations on racing vehicles. It required a 14 dB reduction in sound output, limited sound output at half meter to 115 dB(A), and no more than 105 dB(A) at 50 feet.

==== Motor vehicle sound systems ====
This provision is both an objective emission control, a subjective emission control, and a subjective immission for vehicles on a public right-of-way. The first part limits the system sound level at a fixed distance. The second part uses the plainly audible definition for limiting the sound output. The third part uses the noise disturbance definition to limit the impact on neighboring properties and can be applied within public transportation. The most restrictive application of the plainly audible laws says that the sound cannot be audible to anyone other than the vehicle occupants. There are numerous state and community restrictions on vehicle sound systems. Louisiana prohibits the system from emitting sound outside a vehicle. Richmond, CA also prohibits the sound from being audible outside the vehicle. Oregon prohibits sound systems from being plainly audible at 50 feet. California prohibits sound systems that can be heard at 50 feet. Colorado Springs, CO, requires a measurement at 25 feet beyond the private property line or 25 feet from the source on public property; it does not specify a limiting level. In Lakewood, CO it must not be plainly audible beyond 25 feet. In Los Angeles, CA, it cannot be audible beyond 200 feet. In Seattle, WA, it must not be plainly audible at 75 feet. Chicago restricts levels to less than clearly audible at 75 feet. Minneapolis, MN restricts levels to less than audible at 50 feet. Albuquerque, NM restricts plainly audible to 25 feet, but also applies their land use limits. Cincinnati, OH restricts plainly audible to 50 feet. Dallas, TX prohibits sound or vibration that is detectable at 30 feet, or that violates the land use regulations. Houston, TX applies land use restrictions. Omaha, NE states the sound must not be audible at 100 feet. Hammond, IN restricts plainly audible to 25 feet. New Jersey states the sound must not be plainly audible at 50 feet between 8 am and 10 pm and not plainly audible at 25 feet between 10 pm and 8 am. Florida states the sound must not be plainly audible at 25 feet, but exempts business and political systems. Oregon and Tennessee state that the sound must not be plainly audible beyond 50 feet, as does Fairbanks, AK. Rhode Island specifically addresses low frequency sound that can be heard 20 feet from a closed vehicle or 100 feet otherwise. Salt Lake County Health Department, UT considers the sound a violation if it is plainly audible on a common carrier. Austin, TX states it must not be audible at 30 feet.

==== Motor vehicle theft alarms ====
This provision is a subjective emission control with only an operational time limit. Los Angeles, CA () requires silencing in 5 minutes. New York City, NY (Section 24.221(d)) requires automatic shut-off after 10 minutes and a prominent display of the local precinct number and telephone number. Boston, MA (Section 16–26.2) considers it a violation if the alarm is plainly audible at 200 feet and is on more than 5 minutes. Other states and communities have automatic shutoff times from 10 to 15 minutes. Some communities have banned such alarms.

==== Motor vehicle tire squeal and street drag racing ====
This provision is a subjective immission control. It is based on the noise disturbance from drag racing and tire squealing on public rights-of-way. Illinois (625 ILCS 5/11-505) prohibits such activities. Hammond, IN (Section 6.2.14) prohibits such activity if it creates a noise disturbance.

==== Railroads ====
Railroad activity is subject to federal regulations. Most communities do not attempt to regulate train sound. The level of train horns permitted by the Federal Railroad Administration is sufficiently high that community impact occurs. One method to alleviate this sound is to have a community establish a quiet zone where the rail crossings meet federal safety standards so that horn use is not needed.

==== Recreational off-road vehicles ====
This provision is both an objective emission control and a subjective immission control with a curfew. It can apply to both public and private properties. Since these vehicles can move in large open areas, an objective control, limiting maximum sound levels at a fixed distance, is appropriate. Since they also can move in bounded areas near residences, a subjective control is appropriate. Numerous states and cities have emission controls measured at 50 feet; the most common level is 82 dB(A), which is similar to that for motor vehicles on public rights-of-way. Colorado Springs, CO (Section 9.8.204.C) requires a minimum distance of 660 feet from residences. Portland, OR (Section 18.10.020.C) requires the area must be designated for recreational vehicle use. Salt Lake health Department, UT (Section 4.5.10(x)) requires off-highway vehicles to be at least 800 feet from a dwelling during the day and has a curfew from 10 pm to 7 am. They prohibit any noise disturbance and require sound levels to be less than 96 dB(A) at 50 feet.

==== Recreational snowmobiles ====
This provision is both an objective emission control and a subjective immission control with a curfew. It can apply to both public and private properties. Since these vehicles can move in large open areas, an objective control, limiting maximum sound levels at a fixed distance is appropriate. Since they also can move in bounded areas near residences, a subjective control is appropriate. Numerous states and communities have objective controls; the most common maximum level is 78 dB(A). Federal law (36 CFR 2.18) regulates snowmobiles on federal property at 78 dB(A), so states and communities are free to regulate snowmobile sound levels on their property. Lincoln NE (Section 8.24.110) limits levels to 78 dB(A). Maine (Section 13112, Chapter 937) exempts snowmobiles at sanctioned racing events. Illinois (625 ILCS 40 Sec. 4-4)does also.

==== Refuse collection vehicles ====
This provision is an objective emission control and a subjective control. It can place a maximum sound level at a specific distance for the loudest operation. It can set a curfew, or it can be based on noise disturbance in residential zones. Los Angeles, CA (Section 113.01) has a time limit that applies only within 200 feet of any residential building. Chicago, IL (Section 11-4-2900) considers any noise a noise disturbance if the activity occurs between 8 pm and 8 am. Salt Lake City, UT (Section 4.5.6) considers it a noise disturbance if the activities occur between 10 pm and 7 am and closer than 800 feet from a dwelling. Atlanta, GA (Section 74-137(a)(5)prohibits collection between 9 pm and am on a weekend day or legal holiday, except by permit. In Maryland, refuse collection is exempt during daytime hours and must meet maximum land use levels [55 dB(A)] in residential zones at night. Note in some areas garbage trucks themselves play music to let residents know it is time to bring out their garbage.

==== Standing motor vehicles ====
This provision is a subjective immission control. It sets a time limit on engine activity. It can also place a curfew on any engine activity. e. In Salt Lake City, UT (Section 4.5.10(xi)) it is considered a noise disturbance if the operation lasts more than 15 minutes. Dallas, TX (Section 30–3.1) applies the code to vehicles over 14,000 GVWR; they must be more than 300 feet from a residential zone and there is a 10-minute maximum. They also provide a list of idling vehicles that are exempt from prosecution such as buses or active concrete trucks. Hammond, IN (Section 6.2.10) limits operation to 3 minutes in an hour for vehicles over 14,000 GVWR on either public or private property. It exempts buses and taxis. Massachusetts allows idling no more than 5 minutes.

== Building codes ==
In the case of construction of new (or remodeled) apartments, condominiums, hospitals and hotels, many U.S. states and cities have stringent building codes with requirements of acoustical analysis, in order to protect building occupants from exterior noise sources and sound generated within the building itself. With regard to exterior noise, the codes usually require measurement of the exterior acoustic environment in order to determine the performance standard required for exterior building skin design.

The architect can work with the acoustical scientist to arrive at the best cost-effective means of creating a quiet interior (normally 45 dB). The most important elements of design of the building skin are usually: glazing (glass thickness, double pane design, etc.), roof material, caulking standards, chimney baffles, exterior door design, mail slots, attic ventilation ports and mounting of through-the-wall air conditioners. A special case of building skin design arises in the case of aircraft noise, where the FAA has funded extensive work in residential retrofit.

Regarding sound generated inside the building, there are two principal types of transmission. First, airborne sound travels through walls or floor/ceiling assemblies and can emanate from either human activities in adjacent living spaces or from mechanical noise within the building systems. Human activities might include voice, amplified sound systems or animal noise. Mechanical systems are elevator systems, boilers, refrigeration or air conditioning systems, generators and trash compactors. Since many of these sounds are inherently loud, the principle of regulation is to require the wall or ceiling assembly to meet certain performance standards (typically Sound Transmission Class of 50), which allows considerable attenuation of the sound level reaching occupants.

The second type of interior sound is called Impact Insulation Class (IIC) transmission. This effect arises not from airborne transmission, but rather from transmission of sound through the building itself. The most common perception of IIC noise is from footfall of occupants in living spaces above. This type of noise is somewhat more difficult to abate, but consideration must be given to isolating the floor assembly above or hanging the lower ceiling on resilient channel. Commonly a performance standard of IIC equal to 50 is specified in building codes. California has generally led the U.S. in widespread application of building code requirements for sound transmission; accordingly, the level of protection for building occupants has increased markedly in the last several decades.

== U.S. occupational safety regulations ==
The U.S. Occupational Safety and Health Administration has established maximum noise levels for occupational exposure, beyond which mitigation measures or personal protective equipment is required. In recent years, Buy Quiet programs and initiatives have arisen in an effort to combat occupational noise exposures. These programs promote the purchase of quieter tools and equipment and encourage manufacturers to design quieter equipment.

== See also ==
- A-weighting scale regarding the unit normally used in noise regulation
- Aircraft noise for a broader discussion of aircraft noise regulation
- Buy Quiet
- Loud music
- Saia v. New York

General

- Health effects from noise
- Occupational hearing loss
- Environmental noise
- Noise barrier
- Noise pollution
- Noise control
- Soundproofing
