= Ambient noise level =

Background sound pressure level

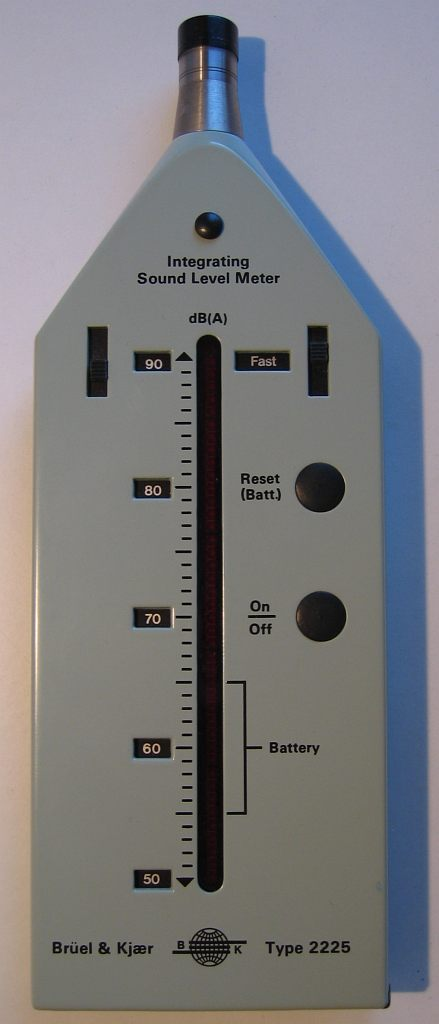
Integrating Sound Level Meter

In atmospheric sounding and noise pollution, ambient noise level (sometimes called background noise level, reference sound level, or room noise level) is the background sound pressure level at a given location, normally specified as a reference level to study a new intrusive sound source.

Ambient sound levels are often measured in order to map sound conditions over a spatial regime to understand their variation with locale. In this case the product of the investigation is a sound level contour map. Alternatively ambient noise levels may be measured to provide a reference point for analyzing an intrusive sound to a given environment. For example, sometimes aircraft noise is studied by measuring ambient sound without presence of any overflights, and then studying the noise addition by measurement or computer simulation of overflight events. Or roadway noise is measured as ambient sound, prior to introducing a hypothetical noise barrier intended to reduce that ambient noise level.

Ambient noise level is measured with a sound level meter. It is usually measured in dB relative to a reference pressure of 0.00002 Pa, i.e., 20 μPa (micropascals) in SI units. This is because 20 μPa is the faintest sound the human ear can detect. A pascal is a newton per square meter. The centimeter-gram-second system of units, the reference sound pressure for measuring ambient noise level is 0.0002 dyn/cm^{2}, or 0.00002 N/m^{2}. Most frequently ambient noise levels are measured using a frequency weighting filter, the most common being the A-weighting scale, such that resulting measurements are denoted dB(A), or decibels on the A-weighting scale.

== See also ==
- Environmental noise
- Noise barrier
- Noise health effects
- Noise level in the sonar equation
- Noise pollution
- Noise regulation
