= Sound baffle =

Device or construct that prevents or attenuates loud noises

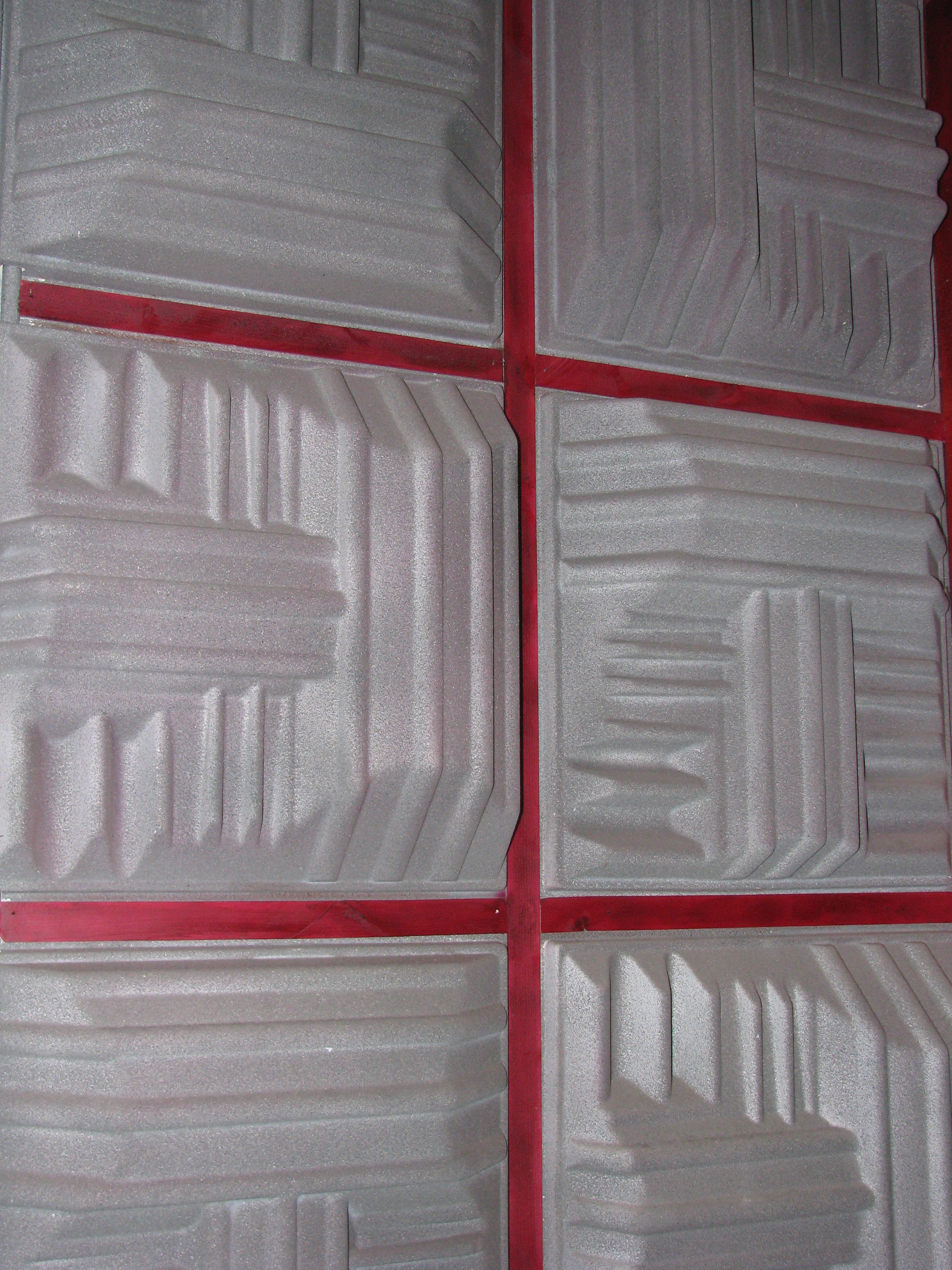
Sound baffles on the wall of a recording studio

A sound baffle is a construction or device which reduces the strength (level) of airborne sound. Sound baffles are a fundamental tool of noise mitigation, the practice of minimizing noise pollution or reverberation. An important type of sound baffle is the noise barrier constructed along highways to reduce sound levels in the vicinity of properties. Sound baffles are also applied to walls and ceilings in building interiors to absorb sound energy and thus lessen reverberation.

== Highway noise barriers ==
The technology for accurate prediction of the effects of noise barrier design using a computer model to analyze roadway noise has been available since the early 1970s. The earliest published scientific design of a noise barrier may have occurred in Santa Clara County, California in 1970 for a section of the Foothill Expressway in Los Altos, California. The county used a computer model to predict the effects of sound propagation from roadways, with variables consisting of vehicle speed, ratio of trucks to automobiles, road surface type, roadway geometrics, micro-meteorology and the design of proposed soundwalls.

== Interior sound baffle design ==
Since the early 1900s, scientists have been aware of the utility of certain types of interior coatings or baffles to improve the acoustics of concert halls, theaters, conference rooms and other spaces where sound quality is important. By the mid-1950s, Bolt, Beranek and Newman and a few other U.S. research organizations were developing technology to address sound quality's design challenges. This design field draws on several disciplines including acoustical science, computer modeling, architecture and materials science. Sound baffles are also used in speaker cabinets to absorb energy from the pressure created by the speakers, thus reducing cabinet resonance.

In 1973, Pearl P. Randolph, a school bus driver in Virginia, won a new school bus in a national contest held by Wayne Corporation for the suggestion that sound baffles be installed in the ceiling of school buses. In 1981, they were first made mandatory by the state of California.

== Vehicle exhaust sound baffles ==
Baffles are also found in the exhaust pipes of vehicles, particularly motorcycles.

== See also ==
- Noise pollution
- Noise health effects
