= Noise Emission by Equipment Used Outdoors Directive =

The Noise Emission by Equipment Used Outdoors Directive 2000/14/EC(Outdoor Noise Directive), adopted in 2000, in force in various stages from 2002-2006, is a directive from the European Union that regulates 57 types of outdoor power equipment, many of which are also regulated by the Machinery Directive.

Originally exterior noise guaranteed sound power level data gathered by equipment testing was intended to be published to the public in a searchable NOISE database. With published values available, such equipment could be compared to best in class and resulting noise levels could be used to assess and manage environmental noise and noise pollution. A further Directive on November 29, 2025 repealed the NOISE database obligations while maintaining the Declaration of Conformity and equipment labeling of the original Directive.

On 16 November 2023 with 2024/1208, the EU commission amended Annex III of the Noise Directive to clarify various testing guidance on the:

1. test environment
2. environmental correction value (K_{2A})
3. measurement surface shape and dimensions
4. number and positions of microphones
5. equipment mounting and installation requirements
6. method for calculating resultant sound power levels where several tests, each with different operating conditions are conducted

In force 30 May 2026, the Internal Market Emergency and Resiliency Act (IMERA), 2024/2749, allows for goods regulated under the Noise Directive to in times of EU market emergency: outbreaks, wars, etc., a clear path for a period of no more than six months, crisis-relevant goods listed under Articles 18 and 3, where a shortage exists under Article 28, rapid importation using the following tools:

- Notify body prioritization
- National derogation from notify body procedures
- Priority market surveillance

== Outdoor power equipment types ==
The table below summarizes regulated types of outdoor power equipment along with the harmonized European Standard (EN) test method that if tested accordingly would presume conformity to the spirit of a typically separate and broader Directive, most likely the Machinery Directive.

During conformity testing, many EN standards relevant to presumed conformity establish the machine configuration whilst testing and in certain cases,

Type	EN / ISO / IEC Standard
Aerial Access Platform with Combustion Engine	EN 280-1:2022
Brush Cutter	EN 22868:2021
Builders' Hoist for Transport of Goods	
Building Site Bandsaw Machine	EN 19085-16:2021 based on EN ISO 3744:2010
Building Site Circular Saw Bench	ISO 7960:1995
Chain Saw, Portable	EN 22868:2021 (combustion) EN 62841-4-1:2020, Annex I (electric)
Combine High Pressure Flusher and Suction Vehicle	
Compaction Machine	EN 500-4:2011 (plates or rammers) EN 474-13:2022 (rollers)
Compressor	EN ISO 2151:2008
Concrete-breakers and Picks, Handheld	(combustion, pneumatic, or hydraulic) EN IEC 62841-2-6:2020/A11:2020, Annex I, Clause 1.2(electric)
Concrete or Mortar Mixer	
Construction Winch	(combustion) EN 14492-2:2019 (electric)
Conveying and Spraying Machine for Concrete and Mortar	
Conveyor Belt	
Cooling Equipment on Vehicles	
Dozer	ISO 6395:2008
Drill Rig	EN 16228-2:2014+A1:2021 (mobile) EN 16228-3:2014+A1:2021 (horizontal directional) EN 16228-7:2014+A1:2021 (with interchangeable auxiliary equipment) EN 16228-1:2014+A1:2021 (other)
Dumper	ISO 6395:2008
Equipment for Loading and Unloading of Silos or Tanks	
Excavator, Hydraulic or Rope-Operated	ISO 6395:2008
Excavator-Loader	ISO 6395:2008
Glass Recycling Unit	
Grader	ISO 6395:2008
Grass Edger/Trimmer	EN 22868:2021
Hedge Trimmer	EN 22868:2021 (combustion) EN IEC 62841-4-2:2019, Annex I, Clause 1.2 (electric)
High Pressure Flusher	
High Pressure Water Jet Machine	EN 60335-2079:2012, Annex CC (pressure < 35 MPa) EN 1829-1:2010, Clause 6.8 (pressure > 35 MPa)
Hydraulic Hammer	
Hydraulic Power Jack	
Joint Cutter	EN 13862:2021, Clause 4.10.2 (pedestrian-controlled) EN ISO 19432-1:2020, Clause 4.19.2 (portable, handheld) (other)
Landfill Compactor, Loader-Type w/ Bucket	ISO 6395:2008
Lawnmower	EN ISO 5395-1:2013 (combustion rotary) EN ISO 5395-1:2013/A1:2018, Clause 4.3 (combustion cylinder) EN IEC 62841-4-2:2021(electric rotary) EN IEC 62841-4-2:2021/A11:2021, Annex I, Clause 1.2(electric cylinder)
Lawn Edger/Trimmer	EN 50636-2-91:2014, Annex CC
Leaf Blower	EN ISO 22868:2021 (combustion) EN 50636-2-100:2014, Annex CC (electric)
Leaf Collector	EN ISO 22868:2021 (combustion) EN 50636-2-100:2014, Annex CC (electric)
Lift Truck (industrial), Combustion Engined, Counterbalanced	EN 12053:2001+A1:2008
Loader	ISO 6395:2008
Mobile Crane	EN 13000:2010+A1:2014, Clause 5.3
Mobile Waste Container	
Motor Hoe	EN ISO 5395-1:2013 (combustion rotary) EN ISO 5395-1:2013/A1:2018, Clause 4.3 (combustion cylinder) EN IEC 62841-4-2:2021(electric rotary) EN IEC 62841-4-2:2021/A11:2021, Annex I, Clause 1.2(electric cylinder)
Paver-Finisher	EN 500-6:2006+A1:2008, Clause 5.17
Piling Equipment	EN 16228-4:2014+A1:2021, Clause 5.8 (foundation) EN 16228-7:2014+A1:2021, Clause 5.3 (piling interchangeable auxiliary equipment) EN 16228-1:2014+A1:2021, Clause 5.27.2.2 (piling any other)
Pipelayer	ISO 6393:2008
Piste Caterpillar	ISO 6393:2008
Power Generator	EN ISO 8528-10:2022
Power Sweeper	EN 17106-2:2021, Clause 4.3 (road) EN 60335-2-72:2012, Annex DD (other)
Refuse Collection Vehicle	EN 1501-4:2023
Road-Milling Machine	EN 500-2;2006+A1:2008, Clause 5.17
Scarifier	EN 13684:2018, Clause 5.16.2 (combustion) EN IEC 62841-4-7:2022, EN IEC 62841-4-7:2022/A11:2022, Annex I, Clause 2.2 (electric)
Shredder/Chipper	Hand-Fed EN 13683:2003+A2:2011, Clause 5.10.2, EN 13683:2003+A2:2011/AC:2013 (combustion) EN 50434:2014, Clause 20.107.2(electric) Forestry horizontally hand-fed EN 13525:2020, Clause 5.5 Forestry vertically hand-fed EN 13525:2020
Snow Removing Machine with Rotating Tools	Road Operation EN 17107-3-1:2021, Clause 4.2 Pedestrian-controlled and ride-on EN ISO 8437-4:2021, Annex A (combustion) (electric)
Suction Vehicle	
Tower Crane	EN 14439:2006+A2:2009, Clause 6.4.1
Trencher	ISO 6394:2008
Truck Mixer	EN 12609:2021, Annex B
Water Pump Unit	EN ISO 20361:2019, EN ISO 20361:2019/A11:2020
Welding Generator	EN ISO 8528-10:2022

== Conformity Assessment Procedures ==
Conformance with the Outdoor Noise Directive can be presumed by a product type, if not explicitly forbidden, by using one of the following Article 14 pathways:

- Annex V - Internal production control (no notify body necessary as OEM self-declares)
- Annex VI - Internal production control with assessment of technical documentation and periodic (up to bi-annually) checks (notify body necessary)
- Annex VII - Unit verification (notify body necessary)
- Annex VIII - Full quality assurance (notify body necessary to approve quality system under which noise is tested)

== Simulated vs. real-world standards ==
While many of the standards listed above test the equipment under ideal conditions as a value to compare between manufacturers meeting the Machinery Directive, real-world emitted noise (Environmental Noise) differs and still may need to be assessed for the Environmental Noise Directive. For example, ISO 6395 as recommended above tests simulated (dynamic) proportional work cycles (travel, digging, dumping, etc.) with a prescriptive machine configuration (fan, travel, and engine speeds, fluid temperatures, etc.) of excavators under ideal conditions, while ISO 6393 tests actual (stationary) work cycles that reflect real world use of the excavator with typical production attachments. Both standards may be useful when determining if the excavator’s Environmental Noise interferes with others outside of the worksite.
