= Quiet area =

Landscape planning concept

"Quiet area" or "quiet areas" is a concept used in landscape planning to highlight areas with good sound quality and limited noise disturbance. The concept is typically used in nature and nature-like areas with high experiential values and/or high accessibility. Despite the name, quiet areas are not "quiet" in the strictest meaning of the word. Rather, they imply a relative quietness, where other sounds than noise are given the chance to come forward. For instance, sounds of nature are often subtle in character, and require absence of noise to be heard. Quietness in its true sense hardly exists at all.

== Background and history ==
In the planning processes for everyday landscapes, the sound environment has traditionally been given relatively low priority. If sound is at all considered, it is mostly in response to problems with environmental noise, dealt with through measurements of sound pressure levels and technical solutions.

Strategies to avoid noise have existed at least since ancient Greece and have been implemented on a wider scale since the 1970s in the western world. While playing a critical role to reduce noise and associated problems with health, noise management does not take account of the experiential qualities inherent in sound. With "quiet areas", it can be said that focus started to shift from noise to include also the potential qualities in the sound environment, like twittering birds, rustling vegetation and rippling water. This holistic way of thinking is in line with the discourse on soundscape, a research field that started to become influential around the same time as the concept of quiet areas was introduced.

In the EU, the notion of quiet areas can be traced to 1996 when it was mentioned in a Green Paper on "Future Noise Policy". Today, the concept is mostly associated with the influential directive on environmental noise from 2002 (2002/49/EC), where it is stipulated that member states should map their quiet areas as well as formulate strategies to protect them from future noise exposure. The instructions and definitions on quiet areas that were mentioned in the directive were vague, and clarifications and guidelines have been added subsequently.

== Definitions and identification strategies ==
Definitions of what a "quiet area" is varies widely, which is partly a result of the formulations used in the END Directive. The directive makes a distinction between two types of quiet areas; in "open country" and in "agglomerations", which are defined as follows:

A quiet area in open country shall mean an area, delimited by the competent authority, that is undisturbed by noise from traffic, industry or recreational activities.

A quiet area in an agglomeration shall mean an area, delimited by the competent authority, for instance which is not exposed to a value of L_{den} or of another appropriate noise indicator greater than a certain value set by the Member State, from any noise source.

In other words; to a large extent, the END directive leaves it to each member state to formulate their own definitions of what qualifies as a quiet area. A number of different interpretations and definitions have come out as a result, many of these were collected in a subsequent publication in the union entitled "Good Practice Guide on quiet areas". Definitions typically include a reference to a benchmark sound pressure level between 25 and 55 dBA.

A method to identify potential for quiet areas has also been brought forward by the EU; the so-called "Quietness Suitability Index" (QSI) uses existing data for noise and land use to indicate potential for quietness. Maps can be accessed through the European Environmental Agency's homepage.

== Examples and applications ==
The UK has seen several initiatives related to quiet areas including an interactive map from the Department for Environment, Food and Rural Affairs (DEFRA) depicting five quiet areas in Belfast.

A smartphone application Hush City has been developed as a means to aid identification of quiet areas from a user perspective. The app was released in 2017 and it is now used internationally by citizens and municipalities to map and assess quiet areas, and share them via an open access web-platform. Examples of initiatives include Berlin and Limerick in Ireland as well as Bristol.

In Sweden, the initiative "Guide to Silence" has been implemented in several municipalities in the Stockholm region. The initiative is noteworthy for its emphasis on marketing quiet areas and making them accessible to the public.

Initiatives have also been taken in Greece and the Netherlands among other places
