= CNEL =

CNEL may refer to:

- Community Noise Equivalent Level, an indicator for the noisiness of neighborhoods in California
- National Council for Economics and Labour, a constitutional organ of the Italian Republic

== See also ==
- Colonel (Cnel)
