= EPNdB =

Measure of aircraft noisiness

Effective perceived noise in decibels (EPNdB) or Effective Perceived Noise Level (EPNL) is a measure of the relative noisiness of an individual aircraft pass-by event. It is used for aircraft noise certification and applies to an individual aircraft, not the noise exposure from an airport. Separate ratings are stated for takeoff, overflight and landing events, and represent the integrated power sum of noisiness during the event. Instantaneous value of noisiness is computed with the PNL or PNdB metric over the period within which the noise from the aircraft is within 10 dB of the maximum noise (usually at the point of closest approach.) It is defined, with computational instructions, in Annex 16 of the Convention on International Civil Aviation and in Part 36 of the US Federal Aviation Regulations. The scaling is such that the EPNdB rating represents the integrated noisiness over a ten-second period; EPNdB of 100 dB means that the event has the same integrated noisiness as a 100 PNdB sound lasting ten seconds. Direct comparison with A-weighted sound pressure level, which is used for many other environmental sound measurements, is not possible because PNdB is a noisiness metric rather than a sound pressure metric.

The term "cumulative" EPNdB is the combination of the noise margins from the three ratings. It is defined as the sum of the individual margins (difference between certified noise level and noise limit) at takeoff lateral, takeoff flyover and approach.

It is important to make the distinction between loudness and noisiness. The same kinds of analytical methods are used but instead of using equal-loudness contours, equal-noisiness contours are derived and used instead.

The EPNdB metric is only used in the US for aircraft certification purposes. In Australia and Canada, it's the basis for the ANEF and NEF noise exposure forecast used in place of the DNL and Day-evening-night metrics used in the US and Europe respectively.

== Computation of EPNdB ==
Detailed information on measurement of aircraft acoustic signature to meet the requirements of Annex 16 is found in ICAO Document 9501 and IEC 61265. Data acquisition in one-third-octave bands is required, followed by processing to yield a logarithmically-scaled value in decibels relative to a sound pressure of 20 micropascals for each one-third-octave band. The individual band sound pressure levels are converted to "noy" values which are then summed in the manner of Stevens' MKVI loudness to yield a total noy value. Noy is a linear unit of noisiness like sone is for loudness, and is then converted into PNL or PNdB (the terms are interchangeable) which is a logarithmic unit like phon which is the logarithmic unit for loudness. EPNdB is the integrated PNdB value over the duration of the pass-by event, normalized to a 10-second event duration using Stevens's power law. The frequency weighting function in the "noy" curves is very close to the old D-weighting curve.

== See also ==
- Aircraft noise
- Noise pollution
- Noise measurement
