= Noise Control Act =

1972 U.S. legislation on noise pollution

Noise Control Act of 1972
- Other short titles: Noise Pollution and Abatement Act of 1972
- Long title: An Act To control the emission of noise detrimental to the human environment, and for other purposes.
- Acronyms (colloquial): NCA
- Enacted by: the 92nd United States Congress
- Effective: October 27, 1972

Citations
- Public law: Public Law 92-574
- Statutes at Large: 86 Stat. 1234

Codification
- Acts amended: Clean Air Act · Federal Aviation Act of 1958
- U.S.C. sections created: 42 U.S.C. ch. 65 (§ 4901 et seq.)
- U.S.C. sections amended: 49 U.S.C. § 1431

Legislative history
- Introduced in the House as H.R. 11021 by D‑FL Paul Rogersth on September 30, 1971; Committee consideration by House Committee on Interstate and Foreign Commerce · Senate Committee on Public Works; Passed the House on February 29, 1972 (356–32); Passed the Senate as the S. 3342 on October 13, 1972 (Voice vote); Reported by the joint conference committee on October 1972; agreed to by the House on October 18, 1972 (Voice vote (agreed to amendments)) and by the Senate on October 18, 1972 (Voice vote (agreed to amendments)); Signed into law by President Richard Nixon on October 27, 1972

Major amendments
- Quiet Communities Act of 1978

The Noise Pollution and Abatement Act of 1972 is a statute of the United States initiating a federal program of regulating noise pollution with the intent of protecting human health and minimizing annoyance of noise to the general public.

The Act established mechanisms of setting emission standards (noise regulation) for virtually every source of noise, including motor vehicles, aircraft, certain types of HVAC (heating, ventilation, and air-conditioning) equipment and major appliances. It also put local governments on notice as to their responsibilities in land-use planning to address noise mitigation. This noise regulation framework comprised a broad data base detailing the extent of noise health effects.

Congress ended funding of the federal noise control program in 1981, which curtailed development of further national regulations. Since then, starting in 1982, the primary responsibility to addressing noise pollution shifted to state and local governments. The Environmental Protection Agency (EPA) retains authority to conduct research and publish information on noise and its effects on the public, which is often included nowadays in environmental impact assessments for new urban developments. The initial EPA regulations and programs provided a basis for development of many state and local government noise control laws across the United States.

== See also ==
- 1972 in the environment, for related contemporaneous events that year
- Aircraft noise, for a treatment of aviation related noise.
- Industrial noise, for a discussion of workplace noise.
- Environmental noise, for a discussion on how noise affects in the environment.
