= Day-night average sound level =

Average noise level over a 24-hour period

The day-night average sound level (Ldn or DNL) is the average noise level over a 24-hour period. The noise level measurements between the hours of 22:00 and 07:00 are artificially increased by 10 dB before averaging. This noise is weighted to take into account the decrease in community background noise of 10 dB during this period. While the calculation method is the same, DNL refers to summation of single-source noise events such as aircraft noise, while Ldn refers to measurements of total noise exposure from all sources.

There is a similar metric called day-evening-night average sound level (Lden or DENL) commonly used in other countries, or Community Noise Exposure Level (CNEL) used in California legislation; that is, the DNL with the addition of an evening period from 19:00 to 22:00 when noise level measurements are boosted 5 dB (or 4.77 dB in the case of CNEL) to account for the approximate decrease in background community noise during this period.

In the US, the Federal Aviation Administration has established this measure as a community noise exposure metric to aid airport noise analyses under Federal Aviation Regulation Part 150. The FAA says that a maximum day-night average sound level of higher than 65 dB is incompatible with residential communities. Communities in affected areas may be eligible for mitigation such as soundproofing.

== See also ==
- Aircraft noise
- Effective perceived noise in decibels rating of aircraft
- Noise pollution
- Noise measurement
- Day–evening–night noise level, the EU equivalent
