= Noise barrier =

Exterior structure on infrastructure used to prevent loud sounds from escaping

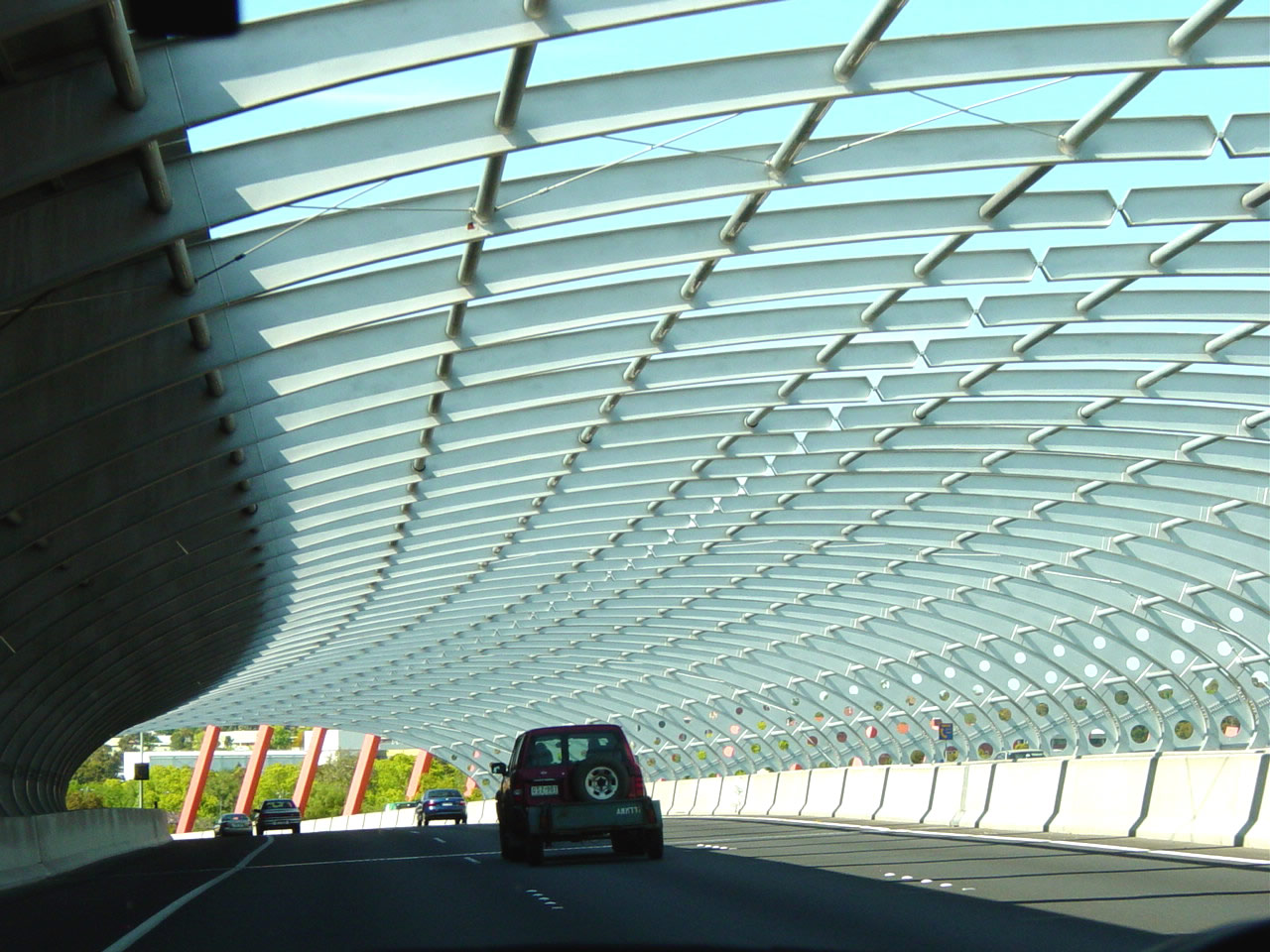
The sound tube in Melbourne, Australia, designed to reduce roadway noise without detracting from the area's aesthetics

A noise barrier (also called a soundwall, noise wall, sound berm, sound barrier, or acoustical barrier) is an exterior structure designed to protect inhabitants of sensitive land use areas from noise pollution. Noise barriers are the most effective method of mitigating roadway, railway, and industrial noise sources – other than cessation of the source activity or use of source controls.

In the case of surface transportation noise, other methods of reducing the source noise intensity include encouraging the use of hybrid and electric vehicles, improving automobile aerodynamics and tire design, and choosing low-noise paving material. Extensive use of noise barriers began in the United States after noise regulations were introduced in the early 1970s.

== History ==
Noise barriers have been built in the United States since the mid-twentieth century, when vehicular traffic burgeoned. The first was installed in 1968 along a section of I-680 in Milpitas, California. In the late 1960s, analytic acoustical technology emerged to mathematically evaluate the efficacy of a noise barrier design adjacent to a specific roadway. By the 1990s, noise barriers that included use of transparent materials were being designed in Denmark and other western European countries.

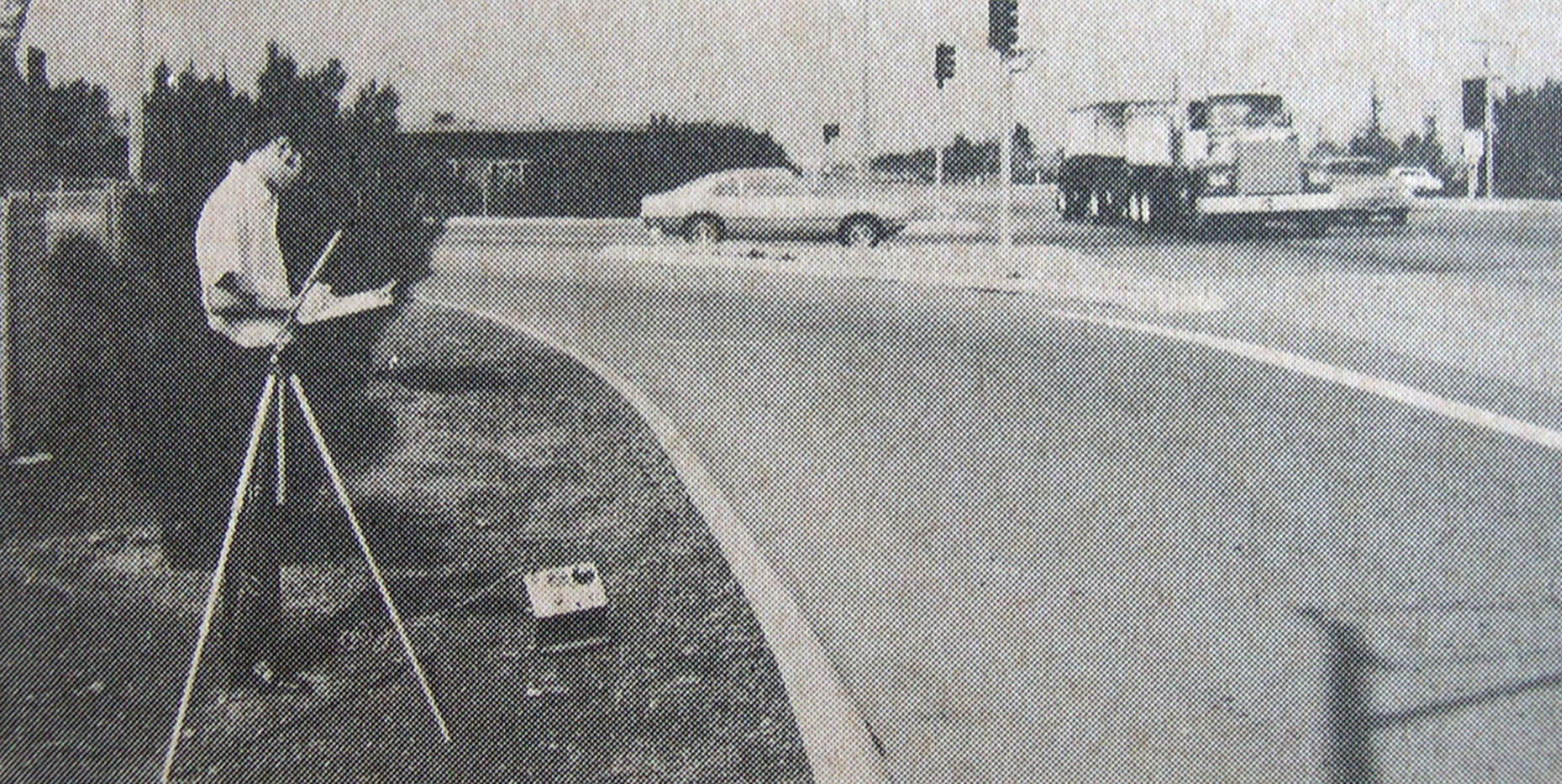
Acoustical scientist measures sound in noise barrier design study, Santa Clara County, California.

The best of these early computer models considered the effects of roadway geometry, topography, vehicle volumes, vehicle speeds, truck mix, road surface type, and micro-meteorology. Several U.S. research groups developed variations of the computer modeling techniques: Caltrans Headquarters in Sacramento, California; the ESL Inc. group in Sunnyvale, California; the Bolt, Beranek and Newman group in Cambridge, Massachusetts, and a research team at the University of Florida. Possibly the earliest published work that scientifically designed a specific noise barrier was the study for the Foothill Expressway in Los Altos, California.

Numerous case studies across the U.S. soon addressed dozens of different existing and planned highways. Most were commissioned by state highway departments and conducted by one of the four research groups mentioned above. The U.S. National Environmental Policy Act, enacted in 1970, effectively mandated the quantitative analysis of noise pollution from every Federal-Aid Highway Act Project in the country, propelling noise barrier model development and application. With passage of the Noise Control Act of 1972, demand for noise barrier design soared from a host of noise regulation spinoff.

By the late 1970s, more than a dozen research groups in the U.S. were applying similar computer modeling technology and addressing at least 200 different locations for noise barriers each year. As of 2006, this technology is considered a standard in the evaluation of noise pollution from highways. The nature and accuracy of the computer models used is nearly identical to the original 1970s versions of the technology.

Small and purposeful gaps exist in most noise barriers to allow firefighters to access nearby fire hydrants and pull through fire hoses, which are usually denoted by a sign indicating the nearest cross street, and a pictogram of a fire hydrant, though some hydrant gaps channel the hoses through small culvert channels beneath the wall.

== Design ==
Examples of noise barriers required to subdue various noise sources.

The acoustical science of noise barrier design is based upon treating an airway or railway as a line source. The theory is based upon blockage of sound ray travel toward a particular receptor; however, diffraction of sound must be addressed.

A barrier's acoustic performance is commonly expressed as its insertion loss - the reduction in sound level at the receiver produced by inserting the barrier into an otherwise open path. For a thin, rigid barrier, the insertion loss is governed largely by the Fresnel number $N = 2\delta/\lambda$, where δ is the difference between the length of the shortest sound path passing over the top of the barrier and the straight-line distance from source to receiver, and λ is the wavelength. Taller barriers, barriers placed closer to the source or receiver, and higher frequencies all increase δ/λ and therefore the attenuation. The empirical design charts published by Maekawa, which relate the Fresnel number to barrier attenuation, remain a widely used basis for barrier design.

Sound waves bend (downward) when they pass an edge, such as the apex of a noise barrier. Barriers that block line of sight will therefore block more sound. Further complicating matters is the phenomenon of refraction, the bending of sound rays in the presence of an inhomogeneous atmosphere. Wind shear and thermocline produce such inhomogeneities. The sound sources modeled must include engine noise, tire noise, and aerodynamic noise, all of which vary by vehicle type and speed.

The noise barrier may be constructed on private land, on a public right-of-way, or on other public land. Because sound levels are measured using a logarithmic scale, a reduction of nine decibels is equivalent to elimination of approximately 86 percent of the unwanted sound power.

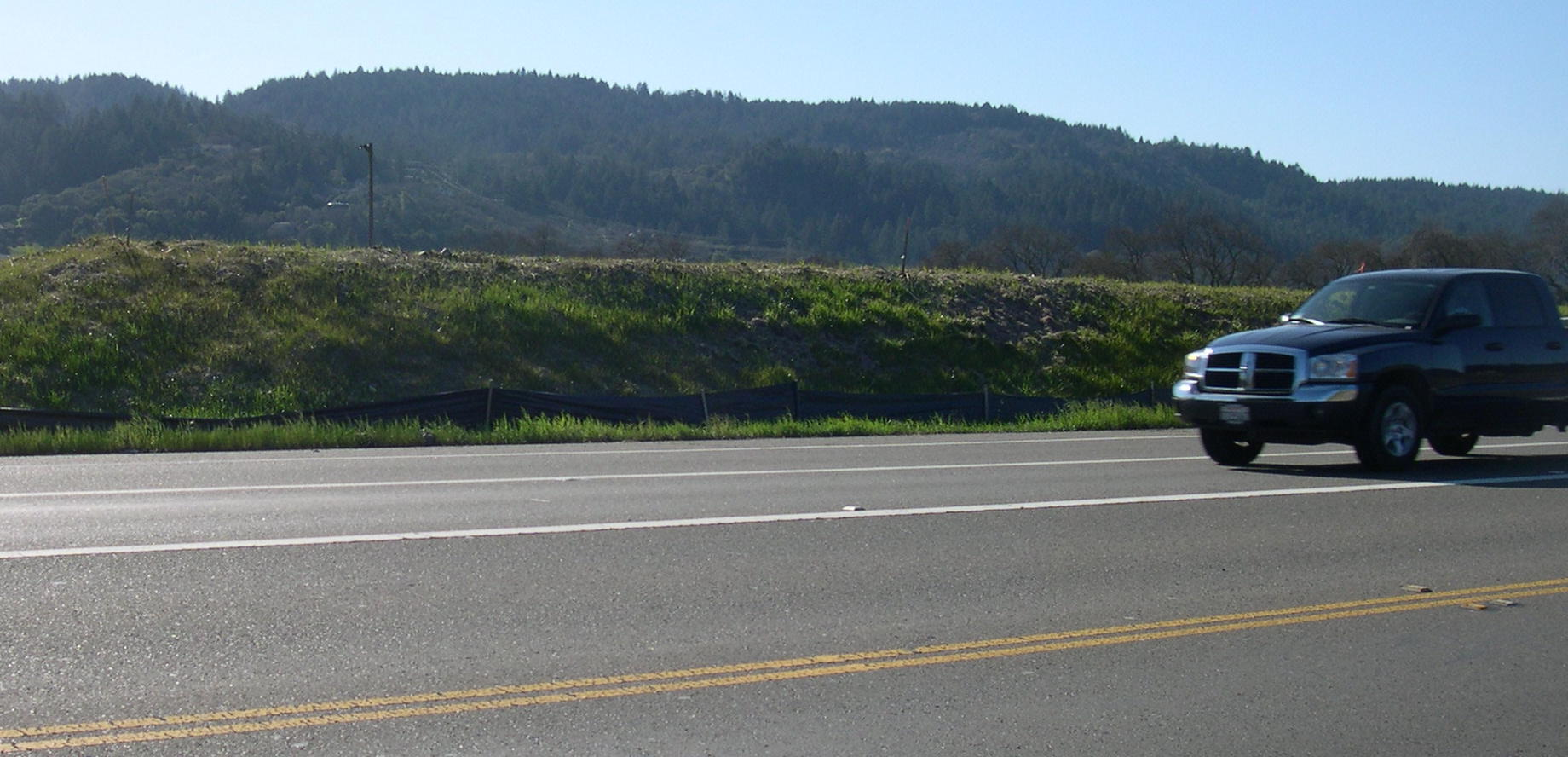
Noise barrier earth berm along California State Route 12, Sonoma County, California

=== Materials ===
Several different materials may be used for sound barriers, including masonry, earthwork (such as earth berm), steel, concrete, wood, plastics, insulating wool, or composites. Walls that are made of absorptive material mitigate sound differently than hard surfaces. It is also possible to make noise barriers with active materials such as solar photovoltaic panels to generate electricity while also reducing traffic noise.

A wall with porous surface material and sound-dampening content material can be absorptive where little or no noise is reflected back towards the source or elsewhere. Hard surfaces such as masonry or concrete are considered to be reflective where most of the noise is reflected back towards the noise source and beyond.

Noise barriers can be effective tools for noise pollution abatement, but certain locations and topographies are not suitable for use of noise barriers. Cost and aesthetics also play a role in the choice of noise barriers. In some cases, a roadway is surrounded by a noise abatement structure or dug into a tunnel using the cut-and-cover method.

== Disadvantages ==
Potential disadvantages of noise barriers include:

- Blocked vision for motorists and rail passengers. Glass elements in noise screens can reduce visual obstruction, but require regular cleaning
- Aesthetic impact on land- and townscape
- An expanded target for graffiti, unsanctioned guerilla advertising, and vandalism
- Creation of spaces hidden from view and social control (e.g. at railway stations)
- Possibility of bird–window collisions for large and clear barriers
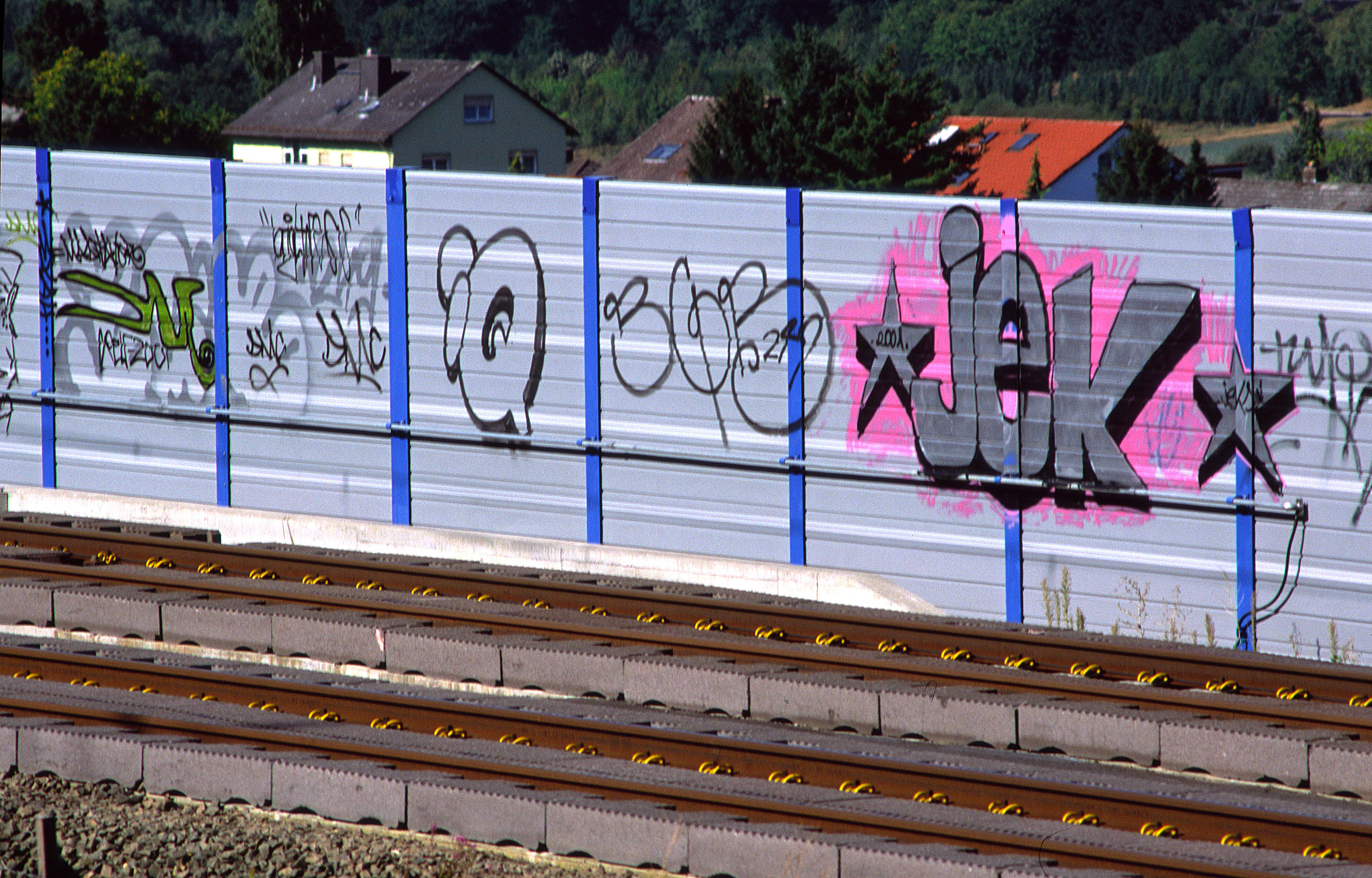
Noise abatement walls often block rail passengers' or road users' view and attract graffiti.

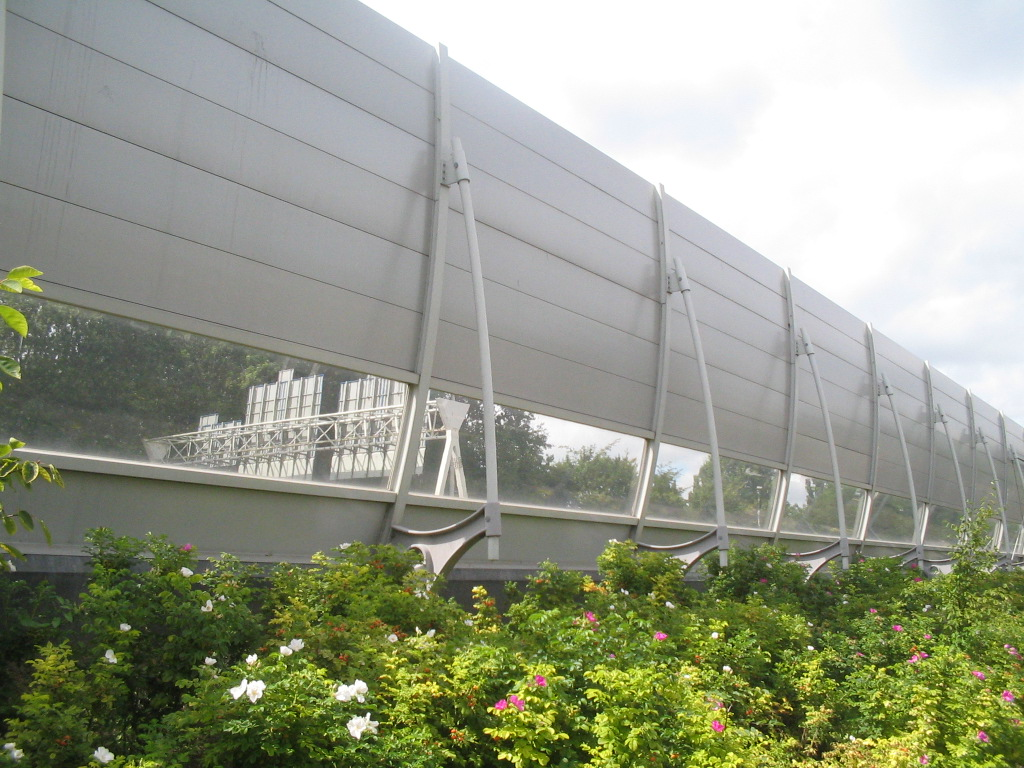
This noise abatement wall in the Netherlands has a transparent section at the driver's eye-level to reduce the visual impact for road users.

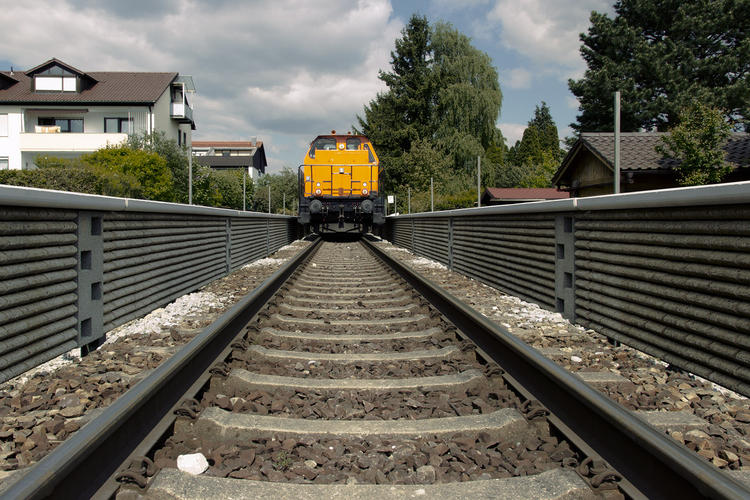
Low walls close to the track avoid optical impact.

== Effects on air pollution ==
Roadside noise barriers have been shown to reduce the near-road air pollution concentration levels. Within 15–50 m from the roadside, air pollution concentration levels at the lee side of the noise barriers may be reduced by up to 50% compared to open road values.

Noise barriers force the pollution plumes coming from the road to move up and over the barrier creating the effect of an elevated source and enhancing vertical dispersion of the plume. The deceleration and the deflection of the initial flow by the noise barrier force the plume to disperse horizontally. A highly turbulent shear zone characterized by slow velocities and a re-circulation cavity is created in the lee of the barrier which further enhances the dispersion; this mixes ambient air with the pollutants downwind behind the barrier.

== See also ==
- Health effects from noise
- Noise control
- Safety barrier
- Soundproofing
