= Community Noise Equivalent Level =

Community Noise Equivalent Level (CNEL) is a weighted average of ambient noise level over time, used in the US state of California to compare the noisiness of neighborhoods. CNEL is frequently used in regulations of airport noise impact on the surrounding community. A CNEL exceeding 65 dB is generally considered unacceptable for a residential neighborhood.
