= Machinery Directive =

European Union directive concerning machinery

The Machinery Directive, Directive 2006/42/EC of the European Parliament and of the Council of 17 May 2006 is a European Union (EU) directive concerning machinery and certain parts of machinery. Its main intent is to ensure a common safety level in machinery placed on the market or put in service in all member states and to ensure freedom of movement within the European Union (EU) and wider European market by stating that "member states shall not prohibit, restrict or impede the placing on the market and/or putting into service in their territory of machinery which complies with [the] Directive".

== European economic directives ==
Economic directives apply to products introduced into the EU. Up until the early 1980s the 'old approach' to product compliance resulted in detailed texts containing all necessary technical and administrative requirements that needed to be met before introducing the product into the EU market. The Machinery Directive took a 'new approach ' by estsablishing general requirements rather than prescriptive text. The particularity of these guidelines is that they set the basic requirements or Essential Health and Safety Requirements (EHSR) that apply to all manufacturers who wish to put their products on the European market. Establishing that if a product meets the essential health and safety requirements, then the product can be placed on the market.

One way of demonstrating compliance with the EHSR can be done through compliance with harmonized European standards or any other solution that allows demonstrating a similar level of safety.

Consequently, the Machinery Directive belongs to the economic legislation. It applies to products designed to be sold (or enabled) in the European Union for the first time by addressing administrative responsibilities of manufacturers, importers of record, and dealers of machinery and safety components. This directive harmonizes the level of safety of products designed and manufactured by different manufacturers. Already installed, used, machines lie outside the scope of this Directive, because they are already on the market. Resale of used machines is governed by additional Directives and separate national laws.

== Current Scope ==
The directive applies to machinery as well as interchangeable equipment, safety components, lifting accessories, chains/ropes/webbing, removable mechanical transmission devices, earthmoving machinery, industrial trucks, and partly completed machinery.

Machinery that is covered by more specific directives is excluded from the scope of this directive. The machinery excluded from the scope includes:

- agricultural and forestry tractors
- motor vehicles and their trailers type approval
- certain electric and electronic products such as household appliances, office equipment, or mobile phones.

== First Publication ==
The first publication of the Machinery Directive took place in 1989 – Directive 89/392/EEC of 14th June 1989 published in OJ L 183 of 29th June 1989 according to Article 100a of the Rome Treaty. The date of entry into force of this Directive was 1 January 1993, with a mandatory effective date of 1 January 1995.. DIrective 89/392/EEC excluded:

- mobile equipment (regulated in 2014 by the Radio Equipment Directive)
- lifting equipment
- manual effort machinery
- direct contact with patients medical machinery
- fairgrounds and/or amusement park equipment
- steam boilers, tanks and pressure vessels (regulated in 2014 by the Pressure Equipment Directive)
- machinery designed or put into service for nuclear purposes
- radioactive sources within machinery
- firearms
- storage tanks and pipelines for petrol, diesel, inflammable liquids and dangerous substances

Directive 89/392/EEC was subsequently amended by the following Directives:

- Directive 91/368/EEC expanded Annex I(adding / modifying parts 3, 4 and 5). and also extended the scope of the Machinery Directive to include interchangeable equipment that modifies the function of a machine, while further excluding other machinery:
  - lifting equipment that moves people (except for industrial trucks).
  - mineral extraction industry vehicles
  - seagoing vessels and mobile offshore units
  - cableways for transporting people.
- Directive 93/44/EEC extended the scope of the Machinery Directive to:
  - safety components,
  - Machinery intended for lifting,
  - the movement of people.
- Directive 93/68/EEC has introduced harmonized provisions establishing "CE" marking that replaced "EC" marking.

== Second Publication ==
A second publication of the Machinery Directive took place in 1998 – Directive 98/37/EC of 22 June 1998 on the harmonization of the laws of all Member States relating to machinery. This directive is the codified version of Directive 89/392/EEC as amended by the directives listed above.

Machine Directive 1998/37/EC This was amended by the following directive:

- Directive 98/79/EC was a minor amendment where "machinery for medical use, for use in direct contact with patients" was replaced by "medical devices"; bringing such . relating to the exclusion of medical devices.

Machinery Directive 98/37/EC remained in force until 29 December 2009.

== Third Publication ==
The third publication of the Machinery Directive took place in 2006 – called new Directive 2006/42/EC, and was adopted in April and 9 June 2006, published in the Official Journal of the EU.

The first recital of Directive 2006/42/EC notes that this "new Machinery Directive " is not entirely new, but is based on Directive 98/37/EC which itself has codified Directive "Machinery" 89/392/EEC amended by Directives 91/368/EEC, 93/44/EEC, 93/68/EEC and 98/79/EC.

Requirements of the new Machinery Directive were transcribed into national law of each country of the European Union (transcript had to be made before 29 June 2008) so that this new machine Directive shall apply starting from 29 December 2009 and replaces Machinery Directive 98/37/EC.

Requirements of this machinery directive and associated European regulations concerns both manufacturers of machine and safety components, machinery distributors and users. The Directive 2006/42/EC lays down the foundation and regulatory basis for the harmonization of Essential Health and Safety Requirements (EHSR) in the field of machinery at the Community level.

No transition period took place in 2009, because manufacturers had more than three years to anticipate these developments and be aware of new requirements.

Changes in relation to the Essential Health and Safety Requirements (EHSR) of the previous directive do not deeply change the Essential Health and Safety Requirements (EHSR).

== Withdrawal and Replacement ==
A new Regulation (EU) 2023/1230 of the European Parliament and of the Council of 14 June 2023 on machinery replaces Directive 2006/42/EC on machinery. The Regulation applies from 20 January 2027. However, some rules apply earlier such as the requirements for notified bodies on the 20 January 2024.
