= Day–evening–night noise level =

European standard to express noise level over an entire day

The day–evening–night noise level or L_{den} is a 2002 European standard to express noise level over an entire day. It imposes a penalty on sound levels during evening and night and it is primarily used for noise assessments of airports, busy main roads, main railway lines and in cities over 100,000 residents. The penalty for sound production during evenings and nights is due to higher nuisance perception during quieter hours and to prevent sleep deprivation for nearby residents.

Examples of several L_{den} levels around Marseille Provence Airport
L_{den} 50 dB

L_{den} 55 dB

L_{den} 65 dB

L_{den} 70 dB

== Definition ==
L_{den} is calculated as:

$L_{\mathrm{den}} = 10 \cdot \log_{10} \left(\frac{1}{24} \left(12\cdot 10 ^ \frac{L_{\mathrm{day}}}{10} + 4\cdot 10 ^\frac{L_{\mathrm{evening}} + 5}{10} + 8\cdot 10 ^\frac{L_{\mathrm{night}} + 10}{10}\right)\right)$

Where the long-term average noise levels are defined as:

Part of the day	hours	penalty (dB)
day	07:00 - 19:00	0
evening	19:00 - 23:00	5
night	23:00 - 07:00	10

The exact hours of the three periods may be chosen differently by individual EU member states.

The formula for L_{den} can be considered a weighted average of the yearly individual noise levels during day, evening and night.

== See also ==
- Environmental noise directive
- Day-night average sound level, the US equivalent
