= Environmental noise =

Noise pollution occurring outdoors

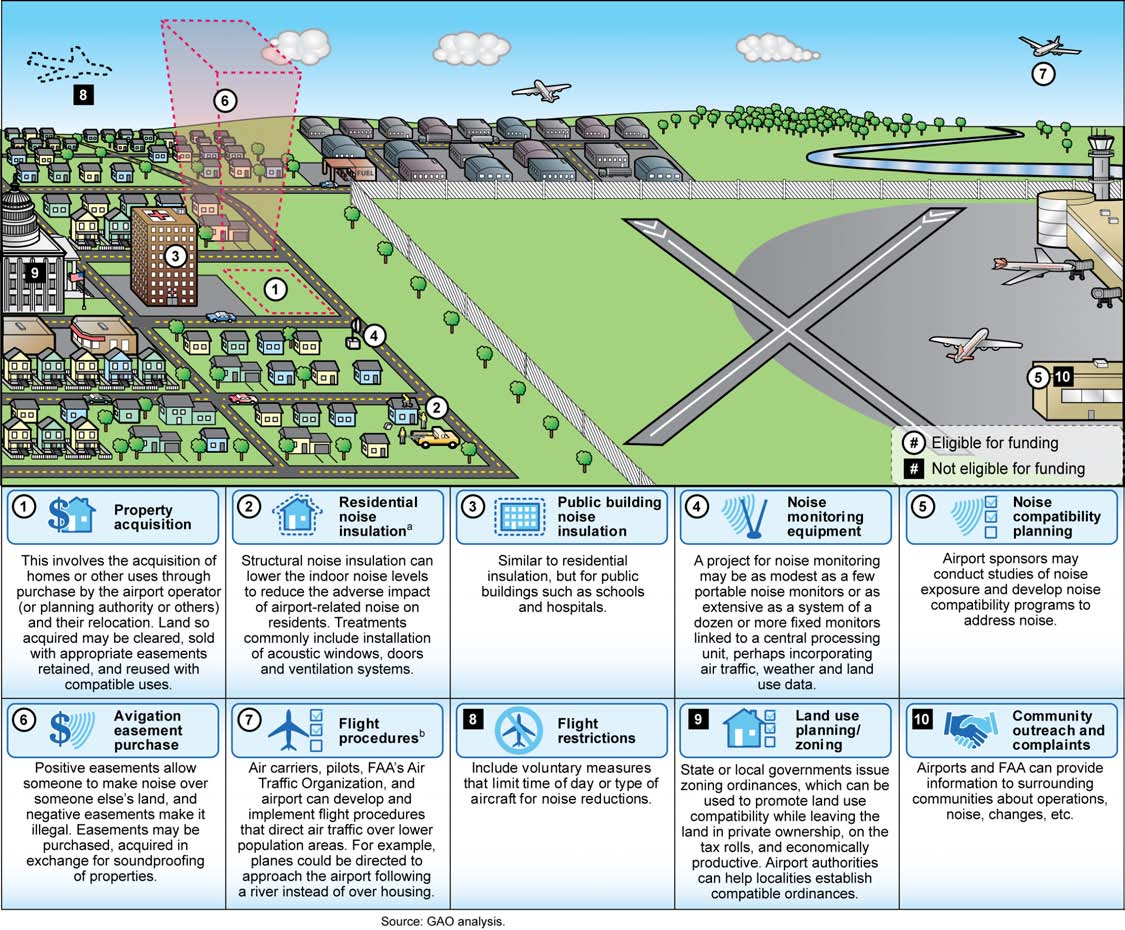
Example of transportation noise and how it affects the community.

Environmental noise is an accumulation of noise pollution that occurs outside. This noise can be caused by transport, industrial, and recreational activities.

Noise is frequently described as 'unwanted sound'. Within this context, environmental noise is generally present in some form in all areas of human, animal, or environmental activity. The effects in humans of exposure to environmental noise may vary from emotional to physiological and psychological. Noise at low levels is not necessarily harmful. Environmental noise can also convey a sense of liveliness in an area, which can be desirable. The adverse effects of noise exposure (i.e. noise pollution) could include: interference with speech or other 'desired' sounds, annoyance, sleep disturbance, anxiety, hearing damage and stress-related cardiovascular health problems.

As a result, environmental noise is studied, regulated, and monitored by many governments and institutions around the world. This creates a number of different occupations. The basis of all decisions is supported by the objective and accurate measurement of noise. Noise is measured in decibels (dB) using a pattern-approved sound level meter. The measurements are typically taken over a period of weeks, in all weather conditions.

== Emission ==
Noise from transportation is typically emitted by machinery (e.g. the engine or exhaust) and aerodynamic noise (see aerodynamics and aircraft noise) caused by the compression and friction in the air around the vessel during motion. Environmental noise from the railway specifically is variable depending on the speed and quality of the tracks used for transportation.

Industrial and recreational noise could be generated by a multitude of different sources and processes. Industrial noise can be generated by factories and plants (i.e., product fabrication or assembly), power generation (hydroelectricity or wind turbines), construction activities, or agricultural and meat processing facilities. Sources of recreational noise vary widely but they can include music festivals, shooting ranges, sporting events, car racing, woodworking, pubs, people's activities on the street, etc.

Sound propagation outdoors is subject to meteorological effects (e.g. wind, temperature) that affect the distance, speed, and direction with which environmental noise travels from a source to a listener.

== Children ==
Children and adolescents are just as susceptible to environmental noise exposure as adults. Similar to adults, with the exposure to noise there can be damaging outcomes on mental health. The environmental noises that children can be exposed to are traffic noise, aircraft, trains, and more. There are some pieces of evidence that show a small correlation between environmental noise and reading and oral comprehension.

Environmental noise in children is most commonly by people around them whether that be siblings crying or friends screaming. Then children are mostly exposed to animal noises and traffic noise. When researchers asked children how they felt when it came to environmental noises around them, more felt negative emotions as compared to positive emotions. The negative emotions were tied to environmental sound, for example, traffic noise, industrial noises, sirens, and alarms. The positive emotions were tied to winds, fans, and everyday household noises.

== Health effects ==
Noise and quality of life are correlated. The increase of environmental noise, especially for those living near railways and airports, has created conflict. Getting adequate and quality sleep is difficult for those who live in areas of high noise exposure. When the body is at rest, noise stimuli is continually being presented in the environment. The body responds to these sounds which can negatively affect sleep.

High exposure to environmental noise can play a role in cardiovascular disease. Noise can raise blood pressure, change heart rate, and release stress hormones. Consistent changes in these health statistics can lead to risks for hypertension, arteriosclerosis, and even more serious events such as a stroke or myocardial infarction.

Sleep deprivation is another aspect of health that is affected by environmental noise. In order for our bodies to function properly, we need sleep and for some people having excessive environmental noise around them can cause difficulties sleeping. For many, even ambient noise can affect their sleep state which can then affect their quality of life and outlook.

Those with misophonia may be particularly affected by environmental noise, especially when the sounds produced are repetitive or continuous over a long period of time.

== Policy and regulation ==
=== United States ===
The Noise Control Act of 1972 established a U.S. national policy to promote an environment for all Americans to be free from noise that jeopardizes their health and welfare. In the past, Environmental Protection Agency (EPA) coordinated all federal noise control activities through its Office of Noise Abatement and Control. The EPA phased out the office's funding in 1982 as part of a shift in federal noise control policy to transfer the primary responsibility of regulating noise to state and local governments. The Noise Control Act of 1972 and the Quiet Communities Act of 1978 were never rescinded by Congress and remain in effect today, although essentially unfunded.

Today, in the absence of a national guidance and enforcement by the EPA, states, cities, and municipalities have had little or no guidance on writing competent and effective noise regulations. Since the EPA last published its Model Community Noise Ordinance in 1974, communities have struggled to develop their ordinances, often relying on copying guidance from other communities, and sometimes copying their mistakes. Noise laws and ordinances vary widely among municipalities though most specify some general prohibition against making noise that is a nuisance and the allowable sound levels that can cross a property line. Some ordinances set out specific guidelines for the level of noise allowable at certain times of the day and for certain activities.

The Federal Aviation Administration (FAA) regulates aircraft noise by specifying the maximum noise level that individual civil aircraft can emit through requiring aircraft to meet certain noise certification standards. These standards designate changes in maximum noise level requirements by "stage" designation. The U.S. noise standards are defined in the Code of Federal Regulations (CFR) Title 14 Part 36 – Noise Standards: Aircraft Type and Airworthiness Certification (14 CFR Part 36). The FAA also pursues a program of aircraft noise control in cooperation with the aviation community. The FAA has set up a process to report aviation-related noise complaints for anyone who may be impacted by Aircraft noise.

The Federal Highway Administration (FHWA) developed noise regulations to control highway noise as required by the Federal-Aid Highway Act of 1970. The regulations requires promulgation of traffic noise-level criteria for various land use activities, and describe procedures for the abatement of highway traffic noise and construction noise.

The U.S. Department of Transportation's Bureau of Transportation Statistics has created a National Transportation Noise Map to provide access to comprehensive aircraft and road noise data on national and county-level. The map aims to assist city planners, elected officials, scholars, and residents to gain access to up-to-date aviation and Interstate highway noise information.

=== European Union ===
The European Union has a special definition based on the European directive 2002/49/EC article 10.1. This directive gives a definition for environmental noise. The main goal is to create an integrated noise management system. The Environmental Noise Directive (END) was created in the European Union to provide guidelines, laws, and standards in the management of environmental noise. The END has created noise mapping, noise action plans, and quiet areas to control environmental noise and the negative effects it can have on individuals.

The implementation is divided into phases: In the first phase, the member states shall inform about major roads with more than six million vehicles a year, major railways with more than 60,000 trains per year, major airports with more than 50,000 movements per year and metropolitan areas with more than 250,000 inhabitants. In the second phase, these numbers are halved; only the criteria for airports remains unchanged. In the third and the following phases, the methods for calculation of the noise levels will change while the criteria remains unchanged. Each phase consists of three steps: the collection of the data from the main sources of noise, strategic noise maps and action plans. The countries listed below follow the guidelines of the European Union.

There are many groups of people affected by environmental noise within the European Union. Shift workers, older adults, and those without proper insulation in their homes are just some of those affected. Within the European Union 40% of people are exposed to environmental noise in their daily commutes on the road which exceeds 55 dB(A). During the daytime, approximately 20% of people are exposed to environmental noise levels above 65 dB(A) and during the nighttime, 30% of people are exposed to environmental noise above 55 dB(A).

==== Austria ====
In Austria the institution which is responsible for the noise sources is also responsible for the noise maps concerning these sources. This means that the Federation is responsible for the federal roads and each state is responsible for the country's roads.

==== France ====
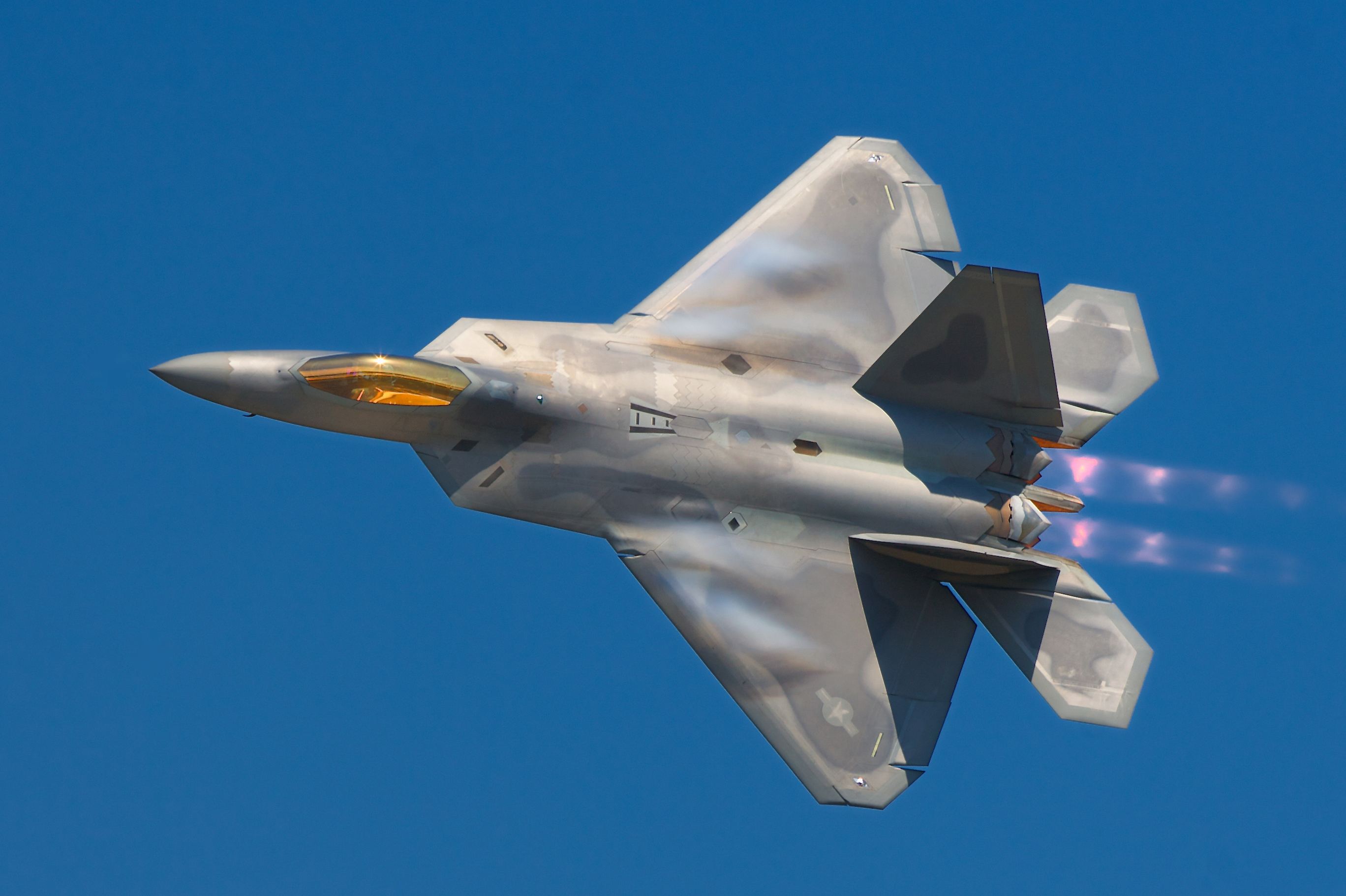
Aircraft noise has been linked to high annoyance, leading to psychological-illness.

France reported 24 metropolitan areas. Paris was the biggest with 9.6 million inhabitants and 272 square kilometres.

Many of France's residents are exposed to high levels of noise. Previously it was estimated that 10% of the population, approximately 2 million people, were exposed to above 70 dB Leq. That number is estimated higher today.

Aircraft plays a major role in environmental noise. A study conducted in 2018 found that while aircraft noise in decibel level cannot cause any psychological-illness, there is a link to how aircraft noise causes an annoyance to residents which then leads to psychological illness. The sensitivity of noise among people has an association with environmental noise and those affects.

==== Germany ====
Germany implemented national regulations in 2005 and 2006 and reported 27 metropolitan areas in the first phase. Berlin was the most populated with 3.39 million inhabitants and 889 square kilometres, Hamburg was considered the largest with 1,045 square kilometres and 2 million inhabitants. The smallest was Gelsenkirchen with 270,000 inhabitants and 105 square kilometres. In the national legislation, noise resulting from recreational activities like sports and leisure is not considered as environmental noise.

=== United Kingdom ===
The United Kingdom has 28 metropolitan areas, and London is the largest with 8.3 million inhabitants. Most are in England. Three are in Northern Ireland, Scotland and Wales.

Within the United Kingdom, researchers revealed that approximately 55% of the population lived where the sound level exceeded the recommended level of 55 dB Leq in the daytime and 67% lived where the sound level exceeded the recommended level of 45 dB Leq at night. About 20% of London residents were exposed to environmental noise near their home that was above 60 dBA Leq. All of these environmental noise exposures have led to higher increases in blood pressure within the UK population.

== See also ==
- Acoustical engineering
- Ambient noise level
- Noise control
- Noise induced hearing loss
- Ambience (sound recording)
- Buy Quiet
- Motorcycle and Scooter (Muffler)
- International Noise Awareness Day

=== General ===
- Noise measurement
- Noise pollution
- Health effects from noise
- Environmental health
- Safe listening
- World Hearing Day

== Notes ==
- Report from the Commission to the European Parliament and the Council concerning Directive 2002/49/EC
- Directive 2002/49/EC of the European Parliament and of the Council of 25 June 2002 relating to the assessment and management of environmental noise
