= Environmental Noise Directive =

European Union directive

The Environmental Noise Directive (END) 2002/49/EC is a directive from the European Union to give information to the public about the noise levels in their living environment, and to assess and manage environmental noise. The directive was adopted in the year 2000.

The END gives a common approach intended to avoid, prevent or reduce the harmful effects of environmental noise. The main target is an integrated noise management. In the first step the competent authorities in the European member states had to produce strategic noise maps for major roads, railways, airports and agglomerations. The second step is to inform and consult the public. In the third step local action plans should be developed to reduce noise.

The implementation is divided into two phases: The first important date was 30 June 2005 until "member states shall inform the Commission of the major roads which have more than six million vehicle passages a year, major railways which have more than 60,000 train passages per year, major airports and the agglomerations with more than 250,000 inhabitants within their territories". Major airports are defined as airports with more than 50,000 movements per year. The second phase started with lower, partly the halve numbers so that major roads are defined as roads with more than three million vehicles, major railways with more than 30,000 trains and agglomerations with more than 100,000 inhabitants. The member states had to send information about these data to the Commission until 30 June 2010. The criteria for airports remained unchanged.
