= Health effects from noise =

Health consequences of exposure to elevated sound levels

More than a quarter of US residences have average outside noise levels exceeding the maximum nighttime outside noise level recommended by the World Health Organization.

Noise health effects are the physical and psychological health consequences of regular exposure to consistent elevated sound levels. Noise from traffic, in particular, is considered by the World Health Organization to be one of the worst environmental stressors for humans, second only to air pollution. Elevated workplace or environmental noise can cause hearing impairment, tinnitus, hypertension, ischemic heart disease, annoyance, and sleep disturbance. Changes in the immune system and birth defects have been also attributed to noise exposure.

Although age-related health effects (presbycusis) occur naturally with age, in many countries the cumulative impact of noise is sufficient to impair the hearing of a large fraction of the population over the course of a lifetime. Noise exposure has been known to induce noise-induced hearing loss, tinnitus, hypertension, vasoconstriction, and other cardiovascular adverse effects. Chronic noise exposure has been associated with sleep disturbances and increased incidence of diabetes. Adverse cardiovascular effects occur from chronic exposure to noise due to the sympathetic nervous system's inability to habituate. The sympathetic nervous system maintains lighter stages of sleep when the body is exposed to noise, which does not allow blood pressure to follow the normal rise and fall cycle of an undisturbed circadian rhythm.

Stress from time spent around elevated noise levels has been linked with increased workplace accident rates, aggression, and other anti-social behaviors. The most significant sources are vehicles, aircraft, prolonged exposure to loud music, and industrial noise. Prolonged exposure to noise at home has been linked to decreased mental health.

There are approximately 10,000 deaths per year as a result of noise in the European Union.

== Noise-induced hearing loss ==
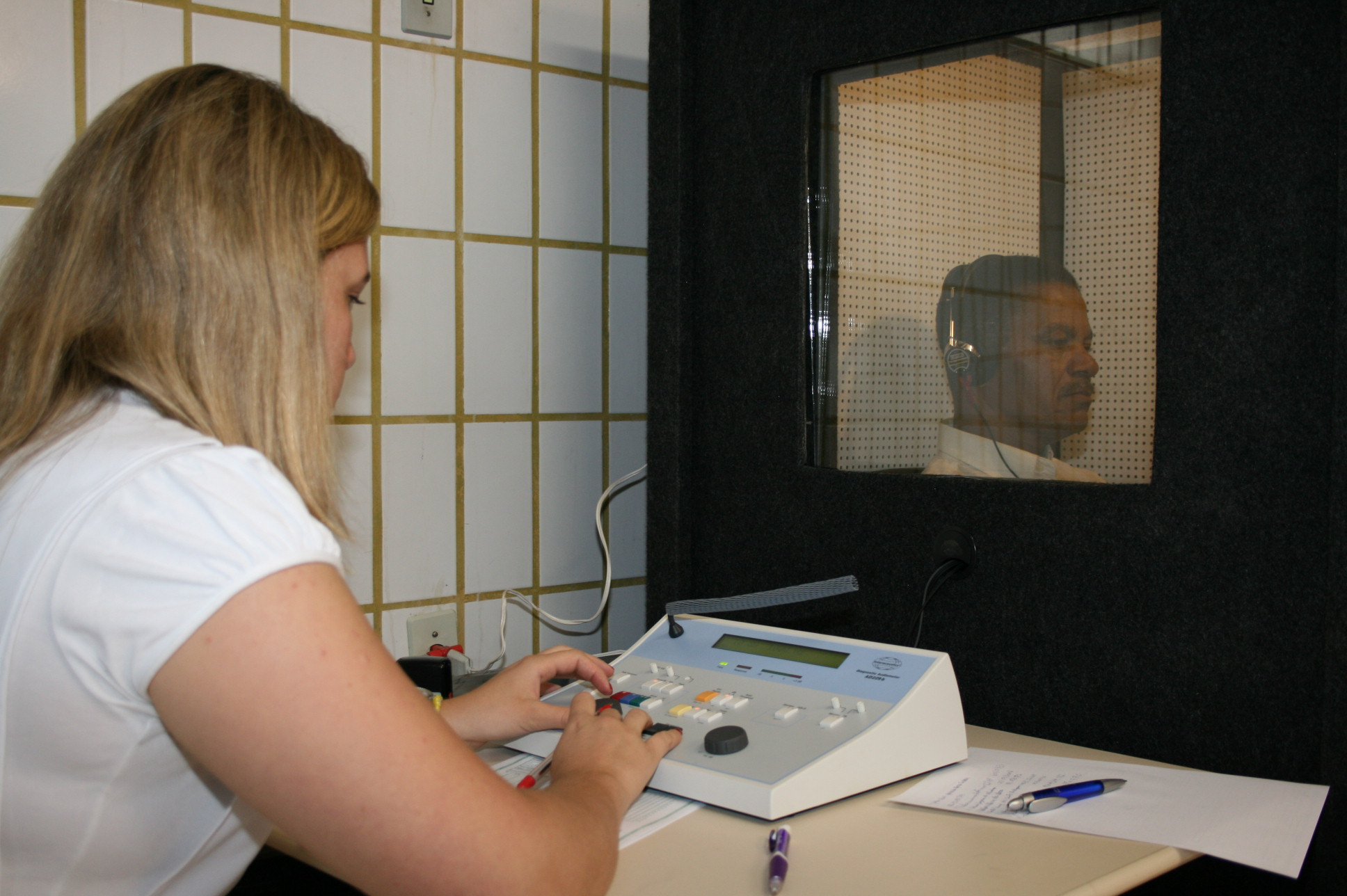
An audiologist conducting an audiometric hearing test in a sound-proof testing booth

Noise-induced hearing loss is a permanent shift in pure-tone thresholds, resulting in sensorineural hearing loss. The severity of a threshold shift is dependent on duration and severity of noise exposure. Noise-induced threshold shifts are seen as a notch on an audiogram from 3000 to 6000 Hz, but most often at 4000 Hz.

Exposure to loud noises, either in a single traumatic experience or over time, can damage the auditory system and result in hearing loss and sometimes tinnitus as well. Traumatic noise exposure can happen at work (e.g., loud machinery), at play (e.g., loud sporting events, concerts, recreational activities), and/or by accident (e.g., a backfiring engine). Noise-induced hearing loss is sometimes unilateral and typically causes patients to lose hearing around the frequency of the triggering sound trauma.

== Tinnitus ==
Tinnitus is an auditory disorder characterized by the perception of a sound (ringing, chirping, buzzing, etc.) in the ear in the absence of an external sound source. There are two types of tinnitus: subjective and objective. Subjective is the most common and can only be heard "in the head" by the person affected. Objective tinnitus can be heard from those around the affected person and the audiologist can hear it using a stethoscope. Tinnitus can also be categorized by the way it sounds in one's ear, pulsatile tinnitus which is caused by the vascular nature of Glomus tumors and non-pulsatile tinnitus which usually sounds like crickets, the sea and bees.

Though the pathophysiology of tinnitus is not known, noise exposure can be a contributing factor; therefore tinnitus can be associated with hearing loss, generated by the cochlea and central nervous system (CNS). High-frequency hearing loss causes a high-pitched tinnitus and low-frequency hearing loss causes a roaring tinnitus. Noise-induced tinnitus can be temporary or permanent depending on the type and amount of noise a person was exposed to.

== Cardiovascular effects ==
Noise has been associated with important cardiovascular health problems, particularly hypertension, as it causes an increase in levels of stress hormones and vascular oxidative stress. Noise levels of 50 dB(A) or greater at night may increase the risk of myocardial infarction by chronically elevating cortisol production.

Traffic noise has several negative effects, including increased risk for coronary artery disease, with night-time exposure to noise possibly more harmful than day-time exposure. It has also been shown to increase blood pressure in individuals within the surrounding residential areas, with railways causing the greatest cardiovascular effects. Roadway noise levels are sufficient to constrict arterial blood flow and lead to elevated blood pressure. Vasoconstriction can result from elevated adrenaline levels or through medical stress reactions. Long-term exposure to noise is correlated to an increase in cortisol and angiotensin-II levels which are respectively associated with oxidative stress and vascular inflammation. Individuals subject to greater than 80 dB(A) in the workplace are at increased risk of having increased blood pressure.

A 2021 systematic review on the effect of occupational exposure to noise on ischemic heart disease (IHD), stroke and hypertension, coordinated by the World Health Organization (WHO) and the International Labour Organization (ILO) located 17 studies that met the inclusion criteria, comprising a total of 534,688 participants (7.47% females) in 11 countries and in three WHO regions (the Americas, Europe, and the Western Pacific). The study found the low quality of evidence the effect of occupational exposure to intense noise (≥85 dBA), compared to occupational exposure below 85 dBA (<85 dBA). They concluded that there is inadequate evidence of harmfulness for the studied outcomes with the exception of the risk of acquiring IHD, which was 29% higher for those exposed to noise in their workplace.

== Other physical health effects ==
Traffic noise may also increase the risk of sleep disturbances, stroke, diabetes, and becoming overweight. Noise pollution is an environmental health concern since it is often a risk factor for developing other diseases like tinnitus or impaired speech discrimination.

== Psychological impacts of noise ==
Causal relationships have been discovered between noise and psychological effects such as annoyance, psychiatric disorders, and effects on psychosocial well-being. Exposure to intense levels of noise can cause personality changes and violent reactions. Noise has been shown to be a factor contributing to violent reactions. The psychological impacts of noise also include an addiction to loud music. This was researched in a study where non-professional musicians were found to have loudness addictions more often than non-musician control subjects.

Psychological health effects from noise also include depression and anxiety. Individuals who have hearing loss, including noise-induced hearing loss, may have their symptoms alleviated with the use of hearing aids. Individuals who do not seek treatment for their loss are 50% more likely to have depression than their aided peers. These psychological effects can lead to detriments in physical care in the form of reduced self-care, work-tolerance, and increased isolation.

Auditory stimuli can also serve as psychological triggers for individuals with post traumatic stress disorder (PTSD).

== Stress ==
Research commissioned by Rockwool, a multi-national insulation manufacturer headquartered in Denmark, reveals that in the UK one third (33%) of victims of domestic disturbances claim that loud parties have left them unable to sleep or made them stressed in the last two years. Around one in eleven (9%) of those affected by domestic disturbances claims it has left them continually disturbed and stressed. More than 1.8 million people claim noisy neighbours have made their life a misery and they cannot enjoy their own homes. The impact of noise on health is potentially a significant problem across the UK given that more than 17.5 million Britons (38%) have been disturbed by the inhabitants of neighbouring properties in the last two years. For almost one in ten (7%) Britons this is a regular occurrence.

The extent of the problem of noise pollution for public health is reinforced by figures collated by Rockwool from local authority responses to a Freedom of Information Act (FOI) request. This research reveals that in the period April 2008 – 2009 UK councils received 315,838 complaints about noise pollution from private residences. This resulted in environmental health officers across the UK serving 8,069 noise abatement notices, or citations under the terms of the Anti-Social Behaviour (Scotland) Act.

Westminster City Council has received more complaints per head of population than any other district in the UK with 9,814 grievances about noise, which equates to 42.32 complaints per thousand residents. Eight of the top 10 councils ranked by complaints per 1,000 residents were in London.

== Annoyance ==
Sudden impulse noises are typically perceived as more bothersome than noise from traffic of equal volume. Annoyance effects of noise are minimally affected by demographics, but fear of the noise source and sensitivity to noise both strongly affect the 'annoyance' of a noise. Sound levels as low as 40 dB(A) can generate noise complaints and the lower threshold for noise producing sleep disturbance is 45 dB(A) or lower.

Other factors that affect the annoyance level of sound include beliefs about noise prevention and the importance of the noise source, and annoyance at the cause (i.e., non-noise-related factors) of the noise. Many of the interpretations of the level of annoyance and the relationship between noise levels and resulting health symptoms could be influenced by the quality of interpersonal relationships at the workplace, as well as the stress level generated by the work itself. Evidence for impact on annoyance of long-term noise versus recent changes is uncertain.

Approximately 35% to 40% of office workers find noise levels from 55 to 60 dB(A) extremely irritating. The noise standard in Germany for mentally stressful tasks is set at 55 dB(A), however, if the noise source is continuous, the threshold level for tolerability among office workers is lower than 55 dB(A).

== Child physical development ==
The U.S. Environmental Protection Agency authored a pamphlet in 1978 that suggested a correlation between low-birthweight (using the World Health Organization definition of less than 2,500 grams (88 oz)) and high sound levels, and also high rates of birth defects in places where expectant mothers are exposed to elevated sound levels, such as typical airport environments. Specific birth abnormalities included harelip, cleft palate, and defects in the spine.

According to Lester W. Sontag of The Fels Research Institute (as presented in the same EPA study): "There is ample evidence that environment has a role in shaping the physique, behavior, and function of animals, including man, from conception and not merely from birth. The fetus is capable of perceiving sounds and responding to them by motor activity and cardiac rate change." The effects of noise exposure are highest when it occurs between 15 and 60 days after conception, a period in which major internal organs and the central nervous system are formed.

Later developmental effects occur as vasoconstriction in the mother reduces blood flow and therefore oxygen and nutrition to the fetus. Low birth weights and noise were also associated with lower levels of certain hormones in the mother. These hormones are thought to affect fetal growth and to be good indicators of protein production. The difference between the hormone levels of pregnant mothers in noisy versus quiet areas increased as birth approached.

In a 2000 publication, a review of studies on birthweight and noise exposure note that while some older studies suggest that when women are exposed to >65 dB aircraft noise, a small decrease in birthweight occurs, in a more recent study of 200 Taiwanese women including noise dosimetry measurements of individual noise exposure, the authors found no significant association between noise exposure and birth weight after adjusting for relevant confounders, e.g. social class, maternal weight gain during pregnancy, etc.

=== Cognitive development ===
When young children are regularly exposed to levels of noise that interfere with speech, they may develop speech or reading difficulties because auditory processing functions are compromised. Children continue to develop their speech perception abilities until they reach their teens. Evidence has shown that when children learn in noisier classrooms, they have more difficulty understanding speech than those who learn in quieter settings.

In a study conducted by Cornell University in 1993, children exposed to noise in learning environments experienced trouble with word discrimination, as well as various cognitive developmental delays. In particular, the writing learning impairment dysgraphia is commonly associated with environmental stressors in the classroom.

High noise levels have also been known to damage the physical health of small children. Children from noisy residences often have a significantly higher heart rate (by 2 beats/min on average) than that of children from quieter homes.

== Prevention ==
A hearing protection device (HPD) is an ear protection device worn in or over the ears while exposed to hazardous noise to help prevent noise-induced hearing loss. HPDs reduce (not eliminate) the level of the noise entering the ear. HPDs can also protect against other effects of noise exposure such as tinnitus and hyperacusis. Proper hygiene and care of HPDs may reduce chances of outer ear infections. There are many different types of HPDs available for use, including earmuffs, earplugs, electronic hearing protection devices, and semi-insert devices. One can measure the personal attenuation rating through a hearing protection fit-testing system.

Earmuff-style hearing protection devices are designed to fit over the outer ear, or pinna. Earmuff HPDs typically consist of two ear cups and a headband. Earplug style hearing protection devices are designed to fit in the ear canal. Earplugs come in a variety of different subtypes. Some HPDs reduce the sound reaching the eardrum through a combination of electronic and structural components. Electronic HPDs are available in both earmuff and custom earplug styles. Electronic microphones, circuitry, and receivers perform active noise reduction, also known as noise-cancelling, in which a signal that is 180-degrees out-of-phase of the noise is presented, which in theory cancels the noise. Canal caps are similar to earplugs in that they consist of a soft tip that is inserted into the opening of the ear canal.

OSHA requires the use of hearing protection. But the HPD (without individual selection, training and fit testing) does not significantly reduce the risk of hearing loss. For example, one study covered more than 19 thousand workers, some of whom usually used hearing protective devices, and some did not use them at all. There was no statistically significant difference in the risk of noise-induced hearing loss.

== Regulations ==
Environmental noise regulations usually specify a maximum outdoor noise level of 60 to 65 dB(A), while occupational safety organizations recommend that the maximum exposure to noise is 40 hours per week at 85 to 90 dB(A). For every additional 3 dB(A), the maximum exposure time is reduced by a factor of 2, e.g. 20 hours per week at 88 dB(A). Sometimes, a factor of two per additional 5 dB(A) is used; however, these occupational regulations are acknowledged by the health literature as inadequate to protect against hearing loss and other health effects. In an effort to prevent noise-induced hearing loss, many programs and initiative have been created, like the Buy Quiet program, which encourages employers to purchase quieter tools and equipment, and the Safe-In-Sound Award, which recognizes organizations with successful hearing loss prevention strategies.

With regard to indoor noise pollution in residences, the U.S. Environmental Protection Agency (EPA) has not set any restrictions on limits to the level of noise. Rather, it has provided a list of recommended levels in its Model Community Noise Control Ordinance, which was published in 1975. For instance, the recommended noise level for indoor residences is less than or equal to 45 dB.

Noise pollution control in residences is not funded by the federal government in part because of the disagreements in establishing causal links between sounds and health risks, since the effect of noise is often psychological and also because it leaves no singular tangible trace of damage on the human body. For instance, hearing loss could be attributed to a variety of factors including age, rather than solely due to excessive exposure to noise. A state or local government can regulate indoor residential noise, however, such as when excessive noise from within a home causes disturbances to nearby residences.

== See also ==
- Aircraft noise
- Buy quiet
- Environmental health
- Infrasound
- Loud music
- The Mosquito, an audio device to discourage loitering
- Noise barrier
- Noise control
- Noise mitigation
- Noise pollution
- Nuisance barking
- Occupational hearing loss
- Power tool
- Safe-In-Sound Award
- Soundproofing
