= Roadway air dispersion modeling =

Study of air pollutant transport from a roadway

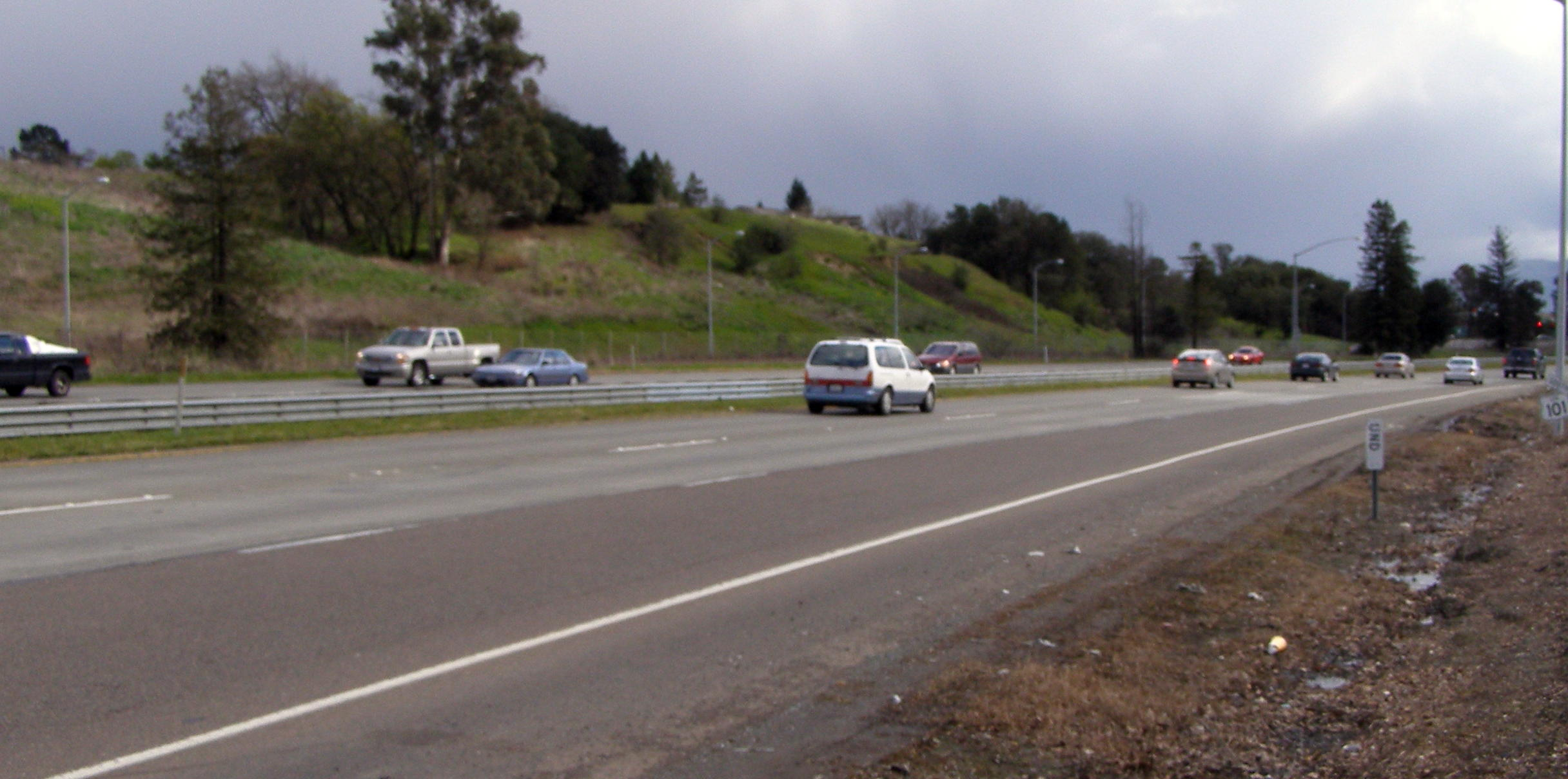
Roadway air dispersion is applied to highway segments

Roadway air dispersion modeling is the study of air pollutant transport from a roadway or other linear emitter. Computer models are required to conduct this analysis, because of the complex variables involved, including vehicle emissions, vehicle speed, meteorology, and terrain geometry. Line source dispersion has been studied since at least the 1960s, when the regulatory framework in the United States began requiring quantitative analysis of the air pollution consequences of major roadway and airport projects. By the early 1970s this subset of atmospheric dispersion models was being applied to real-world cases of highway planning, even including some controversial court cases.

== How the model works ==
The basic concept of the roadway air dispersion model is to calculate air pollutant levels in the vicinity of a highway or arterial roadway by considering them as line sources. The model takes into account source characteristics such as traffic volume, vehicle speeds, truck mix, and fleet emission controls; in addition, the roadway geometry, surrounding terrain and local meteorology are addressed. For example, many air quality standards require that certain near worst-case meteorological conditions be applied.

The calculations are sufficiently complex that a computer model is essential to arrive at authoritative results, although workbook-type manuals have been developed as screening techniques. In some cases where results must be refereed (such as legal cases), model validation may be needed with field test data in the local setting; this step is not usually warranted, because the best models have been extensively validated over a wide spectrum of input data variables.

The product of the calculations is usually a set of isopleths or mapped contour lines either in plan view or cross sectional view. Typically these might be stated as concentrations of carbon monoxide, total reactive hydrocarbons, oxides of nitrogen, particulate or benzene. The air quality scientist can run the model successively to study techniques of reducing adverse air pollutant concentrations (for example, by redesigning roadway geometry, altering speed controls or limiting certain types of trucks). The model is frequently utilized in an Environmental Impact Statement involving a major new roadway or land use change that will induce new vehicular traffic.

== History ==
The logical building block for this theory was the use of the Gaussian air pollutant dispersion equation for point sources. One of the early point source air pollutant plume dispersion equations was derived by Bosanquet and Pearson in 1936. Their equation did not include the effect of ground reflection of the pollutant plume. Sir Graham Sutton derived a point source air pollutant plume dispersion equation in 1947 which included the assumption of Gaussian distribution for the vertical and crosswind dispersion of the plume and also addressed the effect of ground reflection of the plume. Further advances were made by G. A. Briggs in model refinement and validation and by D.B. Turner for his user-friendly workbook that included screening calculations which do not require a computer.

In seeing the need to develop a line source model to approach the study of roadway air pollution, Michael Hogan and Richard Venti developed a closed-form solution to integrating the point source equation in a series of publications.

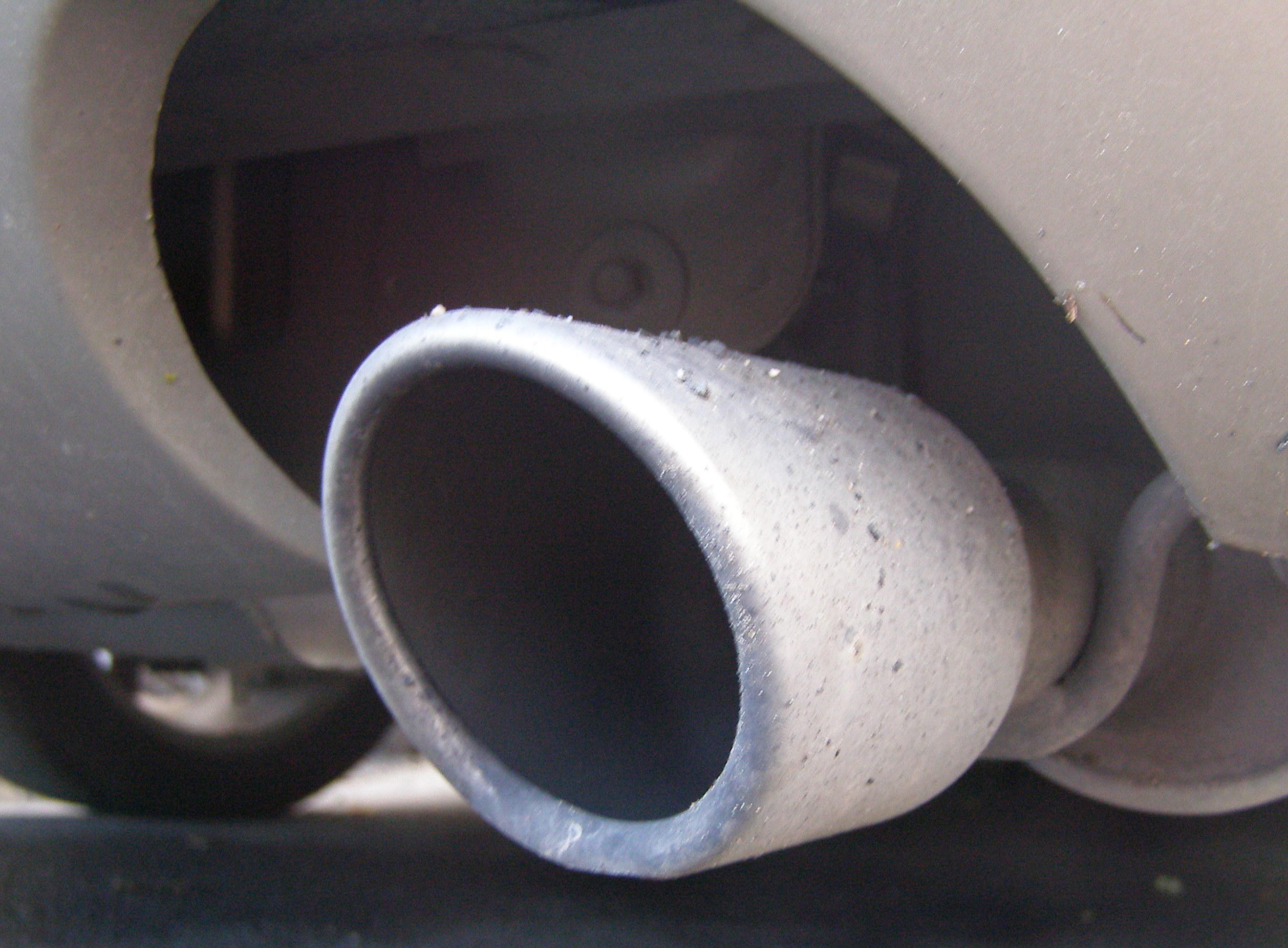
The source of virtually all roadway air pollution emissions is exhaust

While the ESL mathematical model was completed for a line source by 1970, model refinement resulted in a “strip source”, emulating the horizontal extent of the roadway surface. This theory would be the precursor of area source dispersion models. But their focus was roadway simulation, so they proceeded with the development of a computer model by adding to the team Leda Patmore, a computer programmer in the field of atmospheric physics and satellite trajectory calculations. A working computer model was produced by late 1970; then the model was calibrated with carbon monoxide field measurements targeting from traffic on U.S. Route 101 in Sunnyvale, California.

The ESL model received endorsement from the U.S. Environmental Protection Agency (EPA) in the form of a major grant to validate the model using actual roadway tests of tracer gas sulfur hexafluoride dispersion. That gas was chosen since it does not occur naturally or in vehicular emissions and provides a unique tracer for such dispersion studies. Part of the Environmental Protection Agency’s motives may have been to bring the model into public domain. After a successful validation through the EPA research, the model was soon put to use in a variety of settings to forecast air pollution levels in the vicinity of roadways. The ESL group applied the model to the U.S. Route 101 bypass project in Cloverdale, California, the extension of Interstate 66 through Arlington, Virginia, the widening of the New Jersey Turnpike through Raritan and East Brunswick, New Jersey, and several transportation projects in Boston for the Boston Transportation Planning Review.

By the early 1970s at least two other research groups were known to be actively developing some type to roadway air dispersion model: the Environmental Research and Technology group of Lexington, Massachusetts and Caltrans headquarters in Sacramento, California. The Caline model of Caltrans borrowed some of the technology from the ESL Inc. group, since Caltrans funded some of the early model application work in Cloverdale and other locations and was given rights to use parts of their model.

== The theory ==
The resulting solution for an infinite line source is:

$\chi\ = \int_{0}^{\infty}\frac{q}{\pi\left(u c d x^2\right)\left(cos \alpha\ \right)}\left(\exp\frac{y^2}{2c^2x^2}\right) dx$

where:

x is the distance from the observer to the roadway

y is the height of the observer

u is the mean wind speed

α is the angle of tilt of the line source relative to the reference frame

c and d are the standard deviation of horizontal and vertical wind directions (measured in radians) respectively.

This equation was integrated into a closed form solution using the error function (erf), and variations in geometry can be performed to include the full infinite line, line segment, elevated line, or arc made from segments. In any case one can calculate three-dimensional contours of resulting air pollutant concentrations and use the mathematical model to study alternative roadway designs, various assumptions of worst-case meteorology or varying traffic conditions (for example, variations in truck mix, fleet emission controls, or vehicle speed).

The ESL research group also extended their model by introducing the area source concept of a vertical strip to simulate the mixing zone on the highway produced by vehicles turbulence. This model too was validated in 1971 and showed a good correlation with field test data.

== Example applications of the model ==
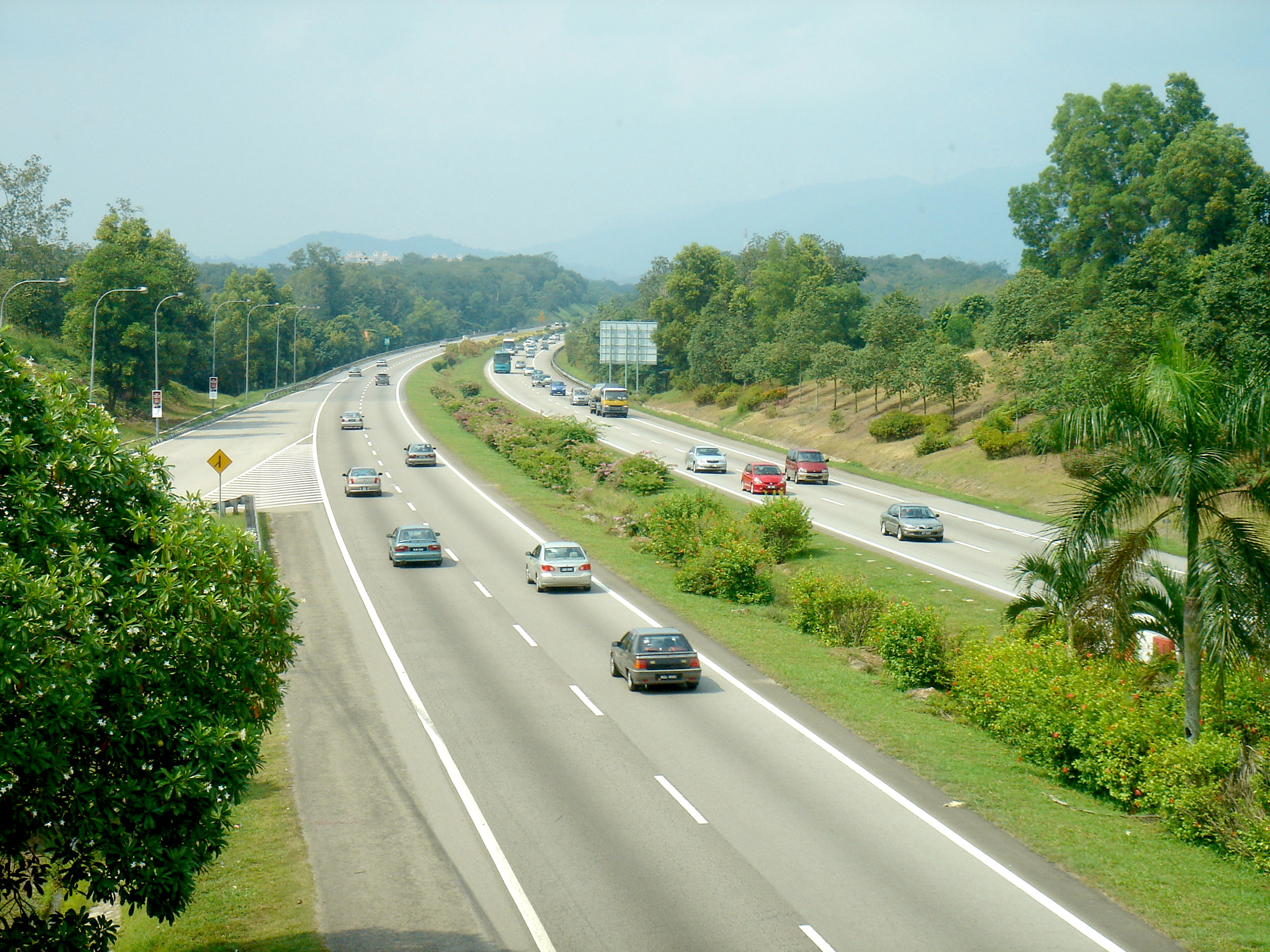
Roadway air dispersion modeling is also done for curved roadways-North-South Express Highway, Malaysia

There were several early applications of the model in somewhat dramatic cases. In 1971 the Arlington Coalition on Transportation (ACT) was the plaintiff in an action against the Virginia Highway Commission over the extension of Interstate 66 through Arlington, Virginia, having filed a suit in the federal district court. The ESL model was used to produce calculations of air quality in the vicinity of the proposed highway. ACT won this case after a decision by the U.S. Fourth Circuit Court of Appeals. The court paid special attention to the plaintiff's expert calculations and testimony projecting that air quality levels would violate Federal ambient air quality standards as set forth in the Clean Air Act.

A second contentious case took place in East Brunswick, New Jersey where the New Jersey Turnpike Authority planned a major widening of the Turnpike. Again the roadway air dispersion model was employed to predict levels of air pollution for residences, schools and parks near the Turnpike. After an initial hearing in Superior Court where the ESL model results were set forth, the judge ordered the Turnpike Authority to negotiate with the plaintiff, Concerned Citizens of East Brunswick and develop air quality mitigation for the adverse effects. The Turnpike Authority hired ERT as its expert, and the two research teams negotiated a settlement to this case using the newly created roadway air dispersion models.

== More recent model refinements ==
The CALINE3 model is a steady-state Gaussian dispersion model designed to determine air pollution concentrations at receptor locations downwind of highways located in relatively uncomplicated terrain. CALINE3 is incorporated into the more elaborate CAL3QHC and CAL3QHCR models. CALINE3 is in widespread use due to its user-friendly nature and promotion in governmental circles, but it falls short of analyzing the complexity of cases addressed by the original Hogan-Venti model. CAL3QHC and CAL3QHCR models are available in the Fortran programming language. They have options to model either particulate matter or carbon monoxide, and include algorithms to simulate queued traffic at signalized intersections.

In addition, several more recent models have been developed that employ non-steady state Lagrangian puff algorithms. The HYROAD dispersion model has been developed through the National Cooperative Highway Research Program's Project 25-06, incorporating ROADWAY-2 model puff and steady-state plume algorithms (Rao et al., 2002).

The TRAQSIM model was developed in 2004 as part of a Ph.D dissertation with support by the U.S. Department of Transportation's Volpe National Transportation Systems Center Air Quality Facility. The model incorporates dynamic vehicle behavior with a non-steady state Gaussian puff algorithm. Unlike HYROAD, TRAQSIM combines traffic simulation, second-by-second modal emissions, and Gaussian puff dispersion into a fully integrated system (a true simulation) that models individual vehicles as discrete moving sources. TRAQSIM was developed as a next generation model to be the successor to the current CALINE3 and CAL3QHC regulatory models. The next step in the development of TRAQSIM is to incorporate methods to model the dispersion of particulate matter (PM) and hazardous air pollutants (HAPs).

Several models have been developed that handle complex urban meteorology resulting from urban canyons and highway configurations. The earliest such model development (1968-1970) was by the Air Pollution Control Office of the U.S. EPA in conjunction with New York City. The model was successfully applied to the Spadina Expressway in Toronto by Jack Fensterstock of the New York City Department of Air Resources. Other examples include the Turner-Fairbank Highway Research Center's Canyon Plume Box model, now in version 3 (CPB-3), the National Environmental Research Institute of Denmark's Operational Street Pollution Model (OSPM), and the MICRO-CALGRID model, which includes photochemistry, allowing for both primary and secondary species to be modeled. Cornell University's CTAG model, which resolves vehicle-induced turbulence (VIT), road-induced turbulence (RIT), chemical transformation and aerosol dynamics of air pollutants using turbulence reacting flow models. The CTAG model has also been applied to characterize highway-building environments and study effects of vegetation barriers on near-road air pollution.

== Recent applications in legal cases ==
Recent health literature indicating that residents near major roads face elevated rates of several adverse health outcomes has prompted legal dispute over the responsibility of transportation agencies to use roadway air dispersion models to characterize the impacts of new and expanded roadways, bus terminals, truck stops, and other sources.

Recently, the Sierra Club of Nevada sued the Nevada Department of Transportation and the Federal Highway Administration over its failure to assess the impact of the expansion of U.S. Route 95 in Las Vegas on neighborhood air quality. The Sierra Club asserted that a supplemental Environmental Impact Statement should be issued to address emissions of hazardous air pollutants and particulate matter from new motor vehicle traffic. The plaintiffs asserted that modeling tools were available, including the Environmental Protection Agency's MOBILE6.2 model, the CALINE3 dispersion model, and other relevant models. The defendants won in the U.S. District Court under Judge Philip Pro, who ruled that the transportation agencies had acted in a manner that was not "arbitrary and capricious," despite the agencies' technical arguments regarding the lack of available modeling tools being contradicted by a number of peer-reviewed studies published in scientific journals (e.g. Korenstein and Piazza, Journal of Environmental Health, 2002). On appeal to the U.S. Ninth Circuit, the Appeals Court stayed new construction on the highway pending the court's final decision. The Sierra Club and the defendants settled out of court, setting up a research program on the air quality impacts of U.S. Route 95 on nearby schools.

A number of other high-profile cases have prompted environmental groups to call for dispersion modeling to be used to assess the air quality impacts of new transportation projects on nearby communities, but to date state transportation agencies and the Federal Highways Administration has claimed that no tools are available, despite models and guidance available through EPA's Support Center for Regulatory Air Models (SCRAM).

Among the more contentious of cases the Detroit Intermodal Freight Terminal and Detroit River International Crossing (Michigan, USA), and the expansion of Interstate 70 East in Denver (Colorado, USA).

In all of these cases, community-based organizations have asserted that modeling tools are available, but transportation planning agencies have asserted that too much uncertainty exists in all of the steps. A major concern for community-based organizations has been transportation agencies' unwillingness to define the level of uncertainty that they are willing to tolerate in air quality analyses, how that compares to the Environmental Protection Agency's guideline on air quality models, which addresses uncertainty and accuracy in model use.

== See also ==
- Air pollution dispersion terminology
- Atmospheric dispersion modeling
- Bibliography of atmospheric dispersion modeling
- Line source
- List of atmospheric dispersion models
- Point source (pollution)
- Volume source (pollution)
