= Roadway noise =

Sound emanating from motor vehicles

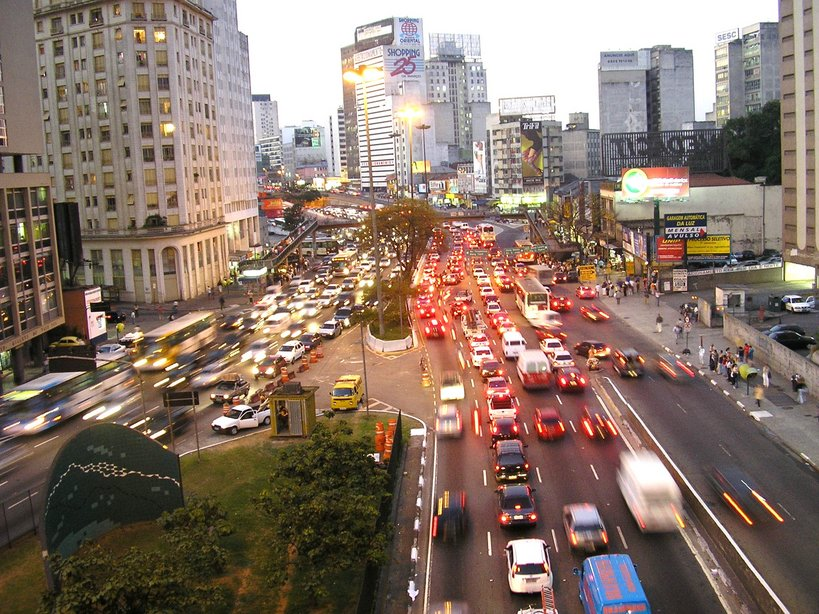
Roadway noise is the most prevalent form of environmental noise. Pictured: São Paulo, Brazil.

Road noise within Vienna, Austria (2023)

Roadway noise is the sound emanating from motor vehicles, collectively from tires contact on road surface, engine/transmission, aerodynamic forces, and braking elements, and specifically police, ambulance, fire-engine sirens, and exhaust pipes noise enhancers, car horns and music. Noise of rolling tires driving on pavement is found to be the biggest contributor of highway noise and increases with higher vehicle speeds.

In developed and developing countries, roadway noise contributes a proportionately large share of the total societal noise pollution. In the U.S., it contributes more to environmental noise exposure than any other noise source.

== History ==
Roadway noise began to be measured in a widespread manner in the 1960s, as computer modeling of this phenomenon began to become meaningful. After passage of the National Environmental Policy Act and Noise Control Act, the demand for detailed analysis soared, and decision makers began to look to acoustical scientists for answers regarding the planning of new roadways and the design of noise mitigation.

Partial bans on motor vehicles from urban areas have been shown to have minimal impacts upon reducing sound levels (as would become clear from later modeling studies); for example, the partial ban in Gothenburg, Sweden resulted in minuscule reduction of sound levels.

Noise regulation in the EU and Japan of tire and power-train noise has only sought to reduce noise by approx 3 dB, and will only slowly take effect because a few older noisier vehicles can dominate the soundscape.

Small reductions in vehicle noise occurred in the 1970s as states and provinces enforced unmuffled vehicle ordinances.

The vehicle fleet noise has not changed very much over the last three decades; however, if the trend in hybrid vehicle use continues, substantial noise reduction will occur, especially in the regime of traffic flow below 35 miles per hour. Hybrid vehicles are so quiet at low speeds that they create a pedestrian safety issue when reversing or maneuvering when parking etc. (but not when travelling forward), and so are typically fitted with electric vehicle warning sounds.

== Causes ==
=== Speed ===
Traffic operations noise is affected significantly by vehicle speeds, since sound energy roughly doubles for each increment of ten miles an hour in vehicle velocity; an exception to this rule occurs at very low speeds where braking and acceleration noise dominate over aerodynamic noise.

=== Vehicles ===
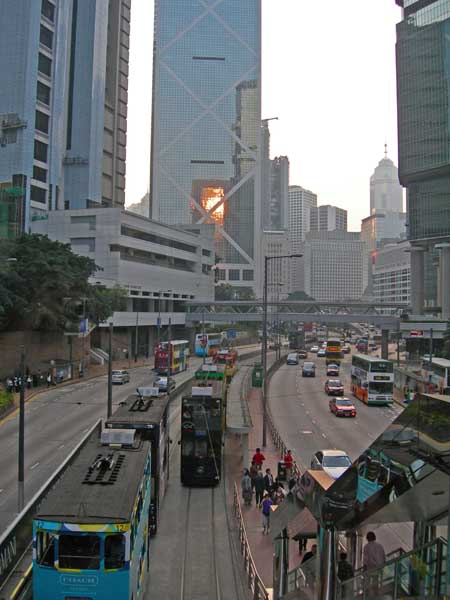
Hong Kong roadway generating noise to adjacent land uses.

Trucks contribute a disproportionate amount of noise not only because of their large engines, but also the height of the diesel stack and the aerodynamic drag. Significant interior noise is usually present inside moving motor vehicles; in fact, passengers are generally not aware that these levels are high, because experience has led motorists to expect levels commonly exceeding 65 dBA.

=== Surfaces ===
Roadway surface types contribute to different noise levels. Of the common types of surfaces in modern cities, there is a 4 dB difference between the loudest and the softest: chip seal type and grooved roads being the loudest, and concrete surfaces without spacers being the quietest, and asphaltic surfaces being about average.

Rubberized asphalt (which uses recycled old tires) is much quieter and is already widely used. Experimental Porous Elastic Road Surfaces (PERS) might cut road noise in half. PERS is made by adding ground up tires to asphalt paving material.

Studies have shown that cutting longitudinal grooves in the pavement reduces noise.

=== Tires ===
Tire types can cause 10 dB(A) variations in noise, based on a 2001 sample of 100 commercially available tires. As of 2001, there was no correlation between grip and noise. Quieter tires may have slightly lower rolling resistance. Tire labeling for noise, grip, and rolling resistance has been widely introduced in Europe, with noisy tires being taxed.

=== Geometry ===
Roadway geometrics and surrounding terrain are interrelated, since the propagation of sound is sensitive to the overall geometry and must consider diffraction (bending of sound waves around obstacles), reflection, ground wave attenuation, spreading loss and refraction. A simple discussion indicates that sound will be diminished when the path of sound is blocked by terrain, or will be enhanced if the roadway is elevated so as to broadcast; however, the complexities of variable interaction are so great, that there are many exceptions to this simple argument.

=== Wind ===
Micrometeorology is significant in that sound waves can be refracted by wind gradients or thermoclines, effectively dismissing the effect of some noise barriers or terrain intervention.

=== Obstacles ===
Geometry of area structures is an important input, since the presence of buildings or walls can block sound under certain circumstances, but reflective properties can augment sound energy at other locations.

== Computer models ==
At a macro level, ongoing research is required for national and worldwide responses to road noise pollution - issues include road surface choices, the regulation and taxing of noisy designs, and the ongoing inspecting of individual vehicles.

At the micro level of managing particular roads, because of the complexity of the variables discussed above, it is necessary to create a computer model that can analyze sound levels in the vicinity of roadways. The first meaningful models arose in the late 1960s and early 1970s addressing the noise line source (e.g. roadway). Two of the leading research teams were BBN in Boston and ESL of Sunnyvale, California. Both of these groups developed complex mathematical models to allow the study of alternate roadway designs, traffic operations and noise mitigation strategies in an arbitrary setting. Later model alterations have come into widespread use among state departments of transportation and city planners, but the accuracy of early models has had little change in 40 years.

Generally the models trace sound ray bundles and calculate spreading loss along with ray bundle divergence (or convergence) from refractive phenomena. Diffraction is usually addressed by establishing secondary emitters at any points of topographic or anthropomorphic "sharpness" (such as noise barriers or building surfaces). Meteorology can be addressed in a statistical manner allowing for actual wind rose and wind speed statistics (along with thermocline data). Recent models have also attempted to predict levels of local air pollution based on an analysis of specific frequencies that are related to tire and engine noise.

=== Case studies of road design ===
An interesting early case where two of the leading models were pitted against each other involved a proposed widening of the New Jersey Turnpike from six to twelve lanes. The BBN and ESL models were on opposing sides of a matter decided in New Jersey Superior Court. This case in the early 1970s was one of the first U.S. examples of acoustical scientists playing a role in the design of a major highway. The models allowed the court to understand the effects of roadway geometry (width in this case), vehicle speeds, proposed noise barriers, residential setback and pavement types. The outcome was a compromise that involved substantial mitigation of noise pollution impacts.

Another early case involved the proposed extension of Interstate 66 through Arlington, Virginia. The plaintiff, Arlington Coalition on Transportation sued the Virginia Department of Transportation on the grounds of air quality, noise and neighborhood disruption. To analyze roadway noise, the ESL model was used by the plaintiff, who won this case partially due to the credibility of the computer model. The matter was revisited a decade later and a greatly reduced highway design with transit element and extensive noise mitigation was agreed to.

Later cases have occurred in every state, both in contentious actions and in routine highway planning and design. The public as well as governmental agencies have become aware of the value of acoustical science to provide useful insights to the roadway design process.

== Worldwide perspective ==
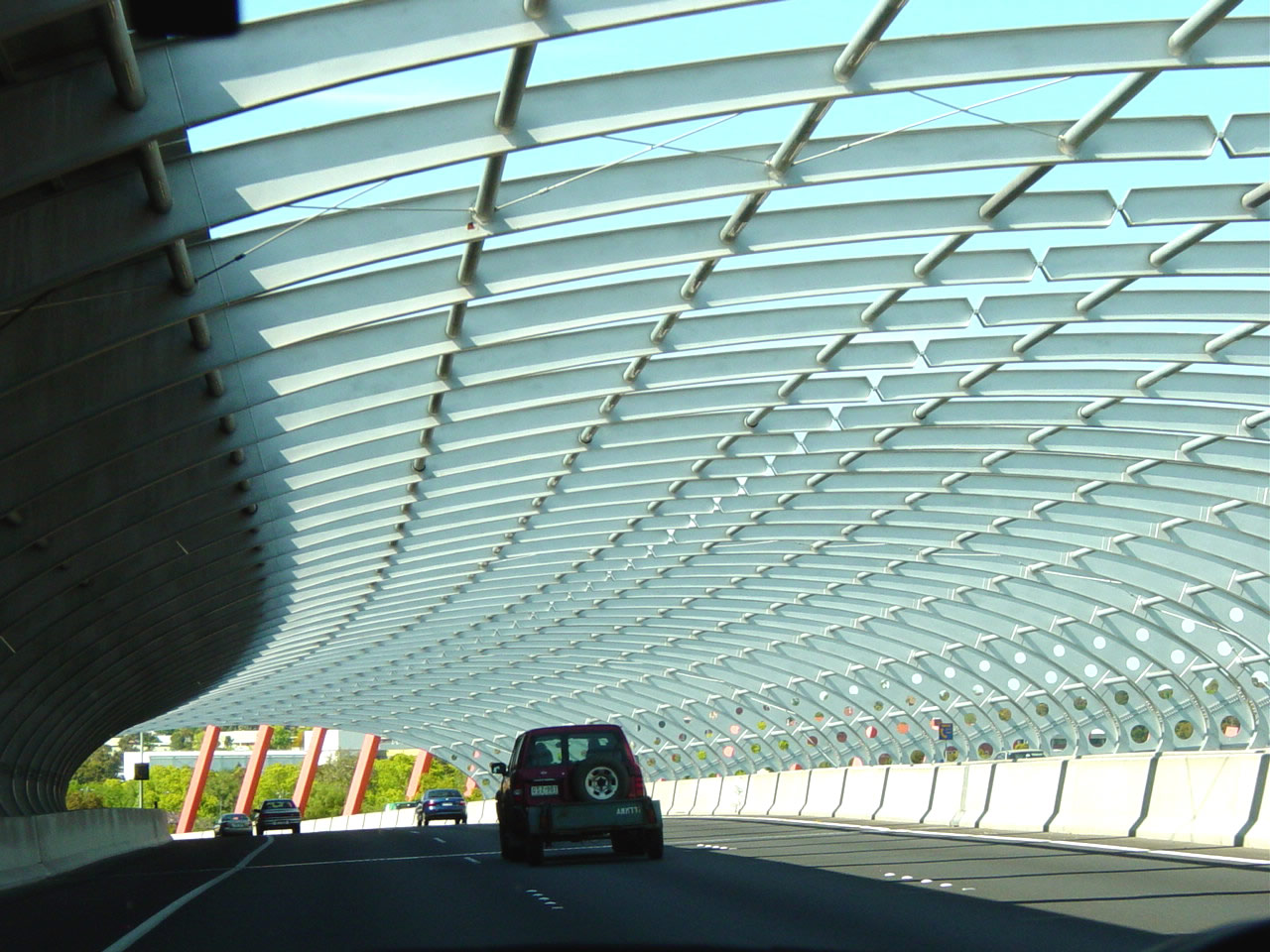
A noise barrier in Melbourne, Australia

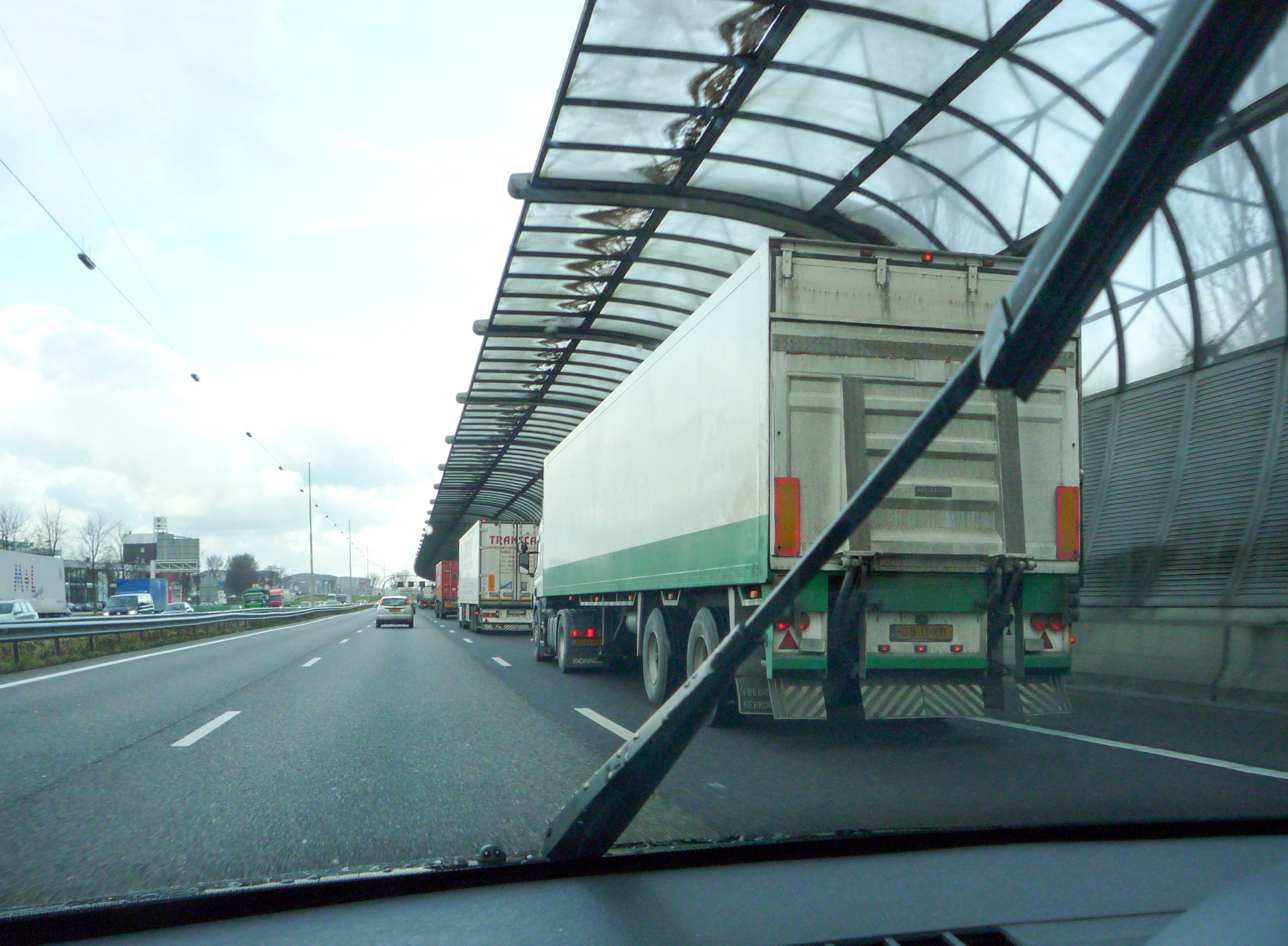
Noise barrier on the A16 near Dordrecht, Netherlands

Even without regulation, there are strong individual economic pressures for quieter vehicles, because owners and employers see quieter vehicles as more luxurious and less stressful. The tighter regulatory requirements of the EU and Japan encourage quieter design even in unregulated countries, because most car manufacturers aspire to international sales. On the other hand, individual owners of motorbikes, 'boom-box' cars (with very loud music systems), and 'muscle-cars' may prefer their vehicle to be louder (at least at idling or low speeds), and such noise (often from modified exhaust systems) can only be controlled by on-going inspection and sanctions.

Several studies have concluded that reducing traffic noise pollution is low-cost or cost-effective. Such studies include consideration of the reduced value of noise-affected real-estate, the costs of supporting a dispersed population 'trying to get away from all the noise', and the increased healthcare costs statistically attributable to a noisier environment.

European technology began to emulate the United States treatment of roadway noise by the 1980s, although the national requirements of noise studies generally remain less stringent than the U.S. In developing countries, noise pollution from motor vehicles represents a significant impact, but technologies are not as advanced as in Western nations. For example, a recent paper from Iran illustrates a level of technology that the United States encountered in the 1960s. The European Union has recently proposed a set of vehicle tire requirements, similar to those introduced in the U.S. in the 1970s.

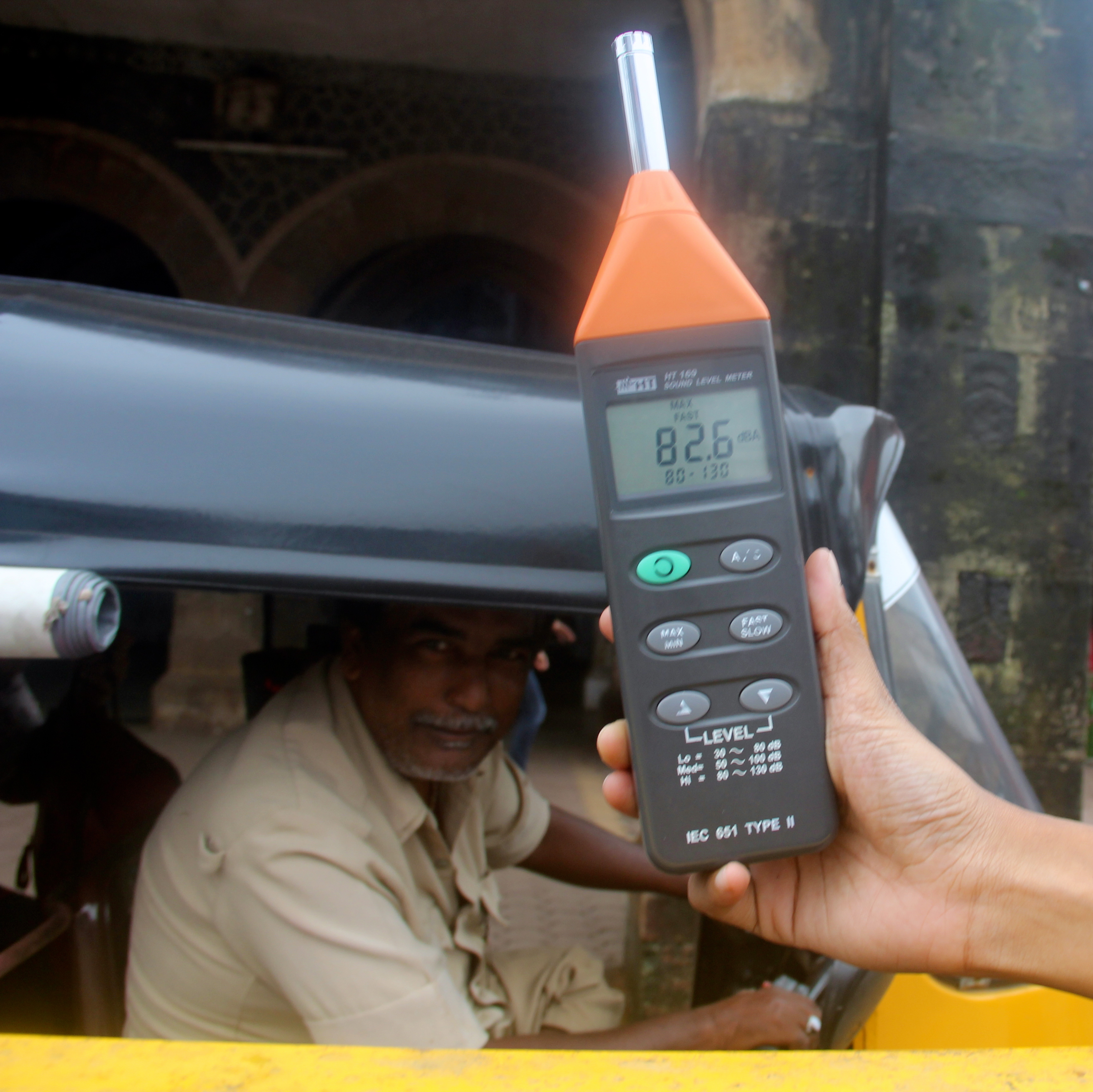
A sound level meter recording traffic noise in Mumbai.

In Mumbai, India, excessive honking and road noise is seen as a significant nuisance. The local police launched an experimental program in 2020 to link the time-length of red lights to an ambient noise sensor, increasing red light times if ambient noise from traffic exceeds limits. This acts as a deterrent to use of the horn.

== See also ==
- Active noise control
