= Tramline =

A tramline (also spelled: tram line) most commonly refers to the tracks and overhead wires used by trams, or a route in a tram network.

Tramline or Tramlines may also refer to:

- Tramlines Festival, a music festival in Sheffield
- Tramlining, the tendency of a vehicle's wheels to follow the contours in the surface upon which it runs
- Tramway track, the tracks on which a tram runs
- Lines on a tennis court
- Tramlines in a field, see Controlled traffic farming
