= Stalking Laura =

1993 American drama film

- UK release poster
- Also known as: I Can Make You Love Me: The Stalking of Laura Black
- Genre: Crime; Drama; Horror; Thriller
- Written by: Frank Abatemarco
- Directed by: Michael Switzer
- Starring: Richard Thomas; Brooke Shields
- Theme music composer: Sylvester Levay
- Country of origin: United States
- Original language: English

Production
- Executive producers: Frank Abatemarco; Ronald H. Gilbert
- Producers: Leonard Hill; Joel Fields
- Production location: Topeka, Kansas
- Cinematography: Robert Draper
- Editor: Mark W. Rosenbaum
- Running time: 92 minutes
- Production companies: Frank Abatemarco Productions; Joel Fields Productions; Leonard Hill Films

Original release
- Network: CBS
- Release: February 9, 1993

Stalking Laura, also known as I Can Make You Love Me: The Stalking of Laura Black, is an American 1993 made-for-television psychological thriller film starring Richard Thomas and Brooke Shields. It is based on the true story of American mass murderer Richard Farley, a former employee of ESL Inc. whose romantic obsession and stalking of co-worker Laura Black led to Farley's murder of numerous colleagues at ESL's headquarters in California. The case drew national attention, ultimately resulting in the enaction of the first anti-stalking laws in the United States.

== Plot ==
Laura Black, a young and ambitious intern from Virginia, accepts a job at Kensitron Electronics International (KEI) in Silicon Valley, California. During a tour of her new workplace, Laura meets long-time KEI employee Richard "Rich" Farley. Rich invites her to a local tractor pull, but she politely declines. She rents a house in Sunnyvale and is accepted as a new roommate by the current tenant.

The next morning, Richard awaits Laura in her office and gives her homecooked blueberry bread to show his affections. In the days that follow, Laura enrolls in a local aerobics class. Shortly after, Rich meets Laura in the parking lot and asks her out, but she politely declines and informs him their relationship is only professional. However, in subsequent encounters, Rich continues to make forceful advances on Laura against her will. At a KEI softball game, Laura is once again confronted by an increasingly agitated Richard, who insists their relationship extends outside the workplace. Laura's friend and co-worker, Glenda Moritz, also observes Farley's inappropriate behavior toward Laura, noting particularly his anger when he observes them looking toward him laughing.

Under the guise of celebrating her birthday with a surprise party, Farley convinces a colleague to access and share information from Laura's personal dossier, including her birthday and address. He later shows up at her apartment with a gift. With her roommate urging, Black informs KEI management of Farley's stalking, yet she insists she can handle the situation alone.

The next day, Laura finds all four of her car tires slashed. She notifies the police, but Rich later confronts Laura on her suspicions but with reverse psychology. Laura finally reports Rich to her boss, Penney, who is skeptical and brushes it off as Laura waited too long. However, Penney does instruct Rich to leave Laura alone at work, which he skirts by enrolling in the same non-work aerobics class as Laura. Rich later photographs Laura in her front yard; then he doctors a picture of himself and Laura together. With her anxiety and fear escalating, Laura and her roommate relocate to a new, more secure, apartment.

A short time later, Richard sneaks into Laura's office after hours and finds her new address, as well as her family records. He then threatens harm to her family if Laura does not accept that she "is meant for him." While visiting her family for Christmas in Virginia, a gift arrives: the above-mentioned doctored photograph of the two of them together, leaving Laura in tears. After returning, she escalates her complaints to her boss, again with little effect. After being ordered to attend a counseling session at work, an enraged Richard confronts Laura in the ladies' restroom at a restaurant, threatening her that things will only get worse. Realizing the situation, Penney and her deputy interrogate Rich, who declares he will kill anyone who attempts to interfere with his "private relationships." He is fired, though Laura is informed (through a cover story) that it's due to non-related circumstances. Rich does not cease, however.

Meanwhile, Laura begins dating Sam Waters, a fellow colleague who fears for Laura's safety. To protect her, Sam teaches her how to use a gun for self-defense. When Rich breaks into her garage and leaves a note on her windshield, Laura confronts him but cannot bring herself to shoot him in defense. At work, Laura receives a major promotion that is delayed because her security clearance is still pending. Laura's supervisor Chris believes it's due to the harassment, and he convinces Laura to file the restraining order against Rich to speed up the process of her work promotion.

Enraged by the court order, Rich sells his SUV to purchase numerous guns, explosives, and over 2,000 rounds of ammunition. At work, Laura is looking forward to her upcoming court appearance for the restraining order to become permanent. On that same day, a heavily armed Rich arrives at the KEI offices in an RV. He blasts his way through the lobby and into the secure offices, killing several employees (including Glenda). Rich enters Laura's office and shoots her in the left shoulder, rendering her unconscious.

SWAT units arrive and evacuate most of the building, though Rich remains holed up with dozens of hostages. While hostage negotiator Lt. Grijalva speaks with him, Laura, although weakened due to loss of blood, makes her way through the ransacked offices. Rich reveals his motive in a telephone call to Grijalva and the authorities: It is revenge for Laura refusing to accept him as her boyfriend and insists she is the guilty party.

Richard continues his rampage, shooting numerous computers. He executes one of his surviving victims, unknowingly shooting Chris through a door, but he also lets his former landlady Nancy leave the building unharmed. After five hours, a tired Rich demands a sandwich and a beverage from the authorities while he considers surrendering. The police produce the food and drink, but Grijalva tells Richard they do not have the proper means of getting it to him. Overcome with exhaustion and dehydration, Rich agrees to surrender to the police. Seemingly unconcerned by the carnage and massacre he has caused, Rich asks Grijalva if he thinks Laura will remember all this.

== Cast ==
- Richard Thomas as Richard Farley
- Brooke Shields as Laura Black
- Viveka Davis as Mary Ann, Laura's roommate.
- William Allen Young as Chris, Laura's section manager at K.E.I.
- Richard Yniguez as Lt. Ruben Grijalva, hostage negotiator.
- Scott Bryce as Sam Waters, Laura's boyfriend.
- T. Max Graham as Captain Olson, police captain.
- Tim Snay as Lt. Bannister, SWAT officer.
- Kevin Brief as Lt. Mark Shegan, police officer.
- Linda Emond as Penny, HR person.
- Dick Mueller as Tom Black.
- Merle Moores as Donna Black.
- Caroline Vinciguerra as Sarah Black.
- Donna Thomason as Glenda Moritz, Laura's co-worker.
- Hollis McCarthy as Phyllis, Laura's co-worker.
- Barbara Houston as Nancy Hammond, Richard's co-worker and landlady.

== Production ==
Filmed in Topeka, Kansas. An office building located at 1420 SW Arrowhead Rd was used as the location for Kensitron Electronics International.

== Reception ==
John Marriott of Radio Times gave a positive review of Shields' and Thomas' performances but criticized the overall depth of characters in the film.
