= Wide span vehicle =

Class of vehicular agricultural machinery

Wide span vehicle is a special type of farming vehicle that is much wider than a typical vehicle. Wide span vehicles can measure up to 10-metre (33 ft) wide or wider. The impetus behind wide span vehicles in farming is to reduce the amount of soil that becomes damaged (e.g., from compaction) from farm vehicles. Controlled traffic farming (CTF) is also aimed at solving this problem and both CTF and wide span vehicles can be used together to further improve land use.

The many benefits of using wide span vehicles in farming include improved soil quality, less land lost to wheelways, increase in farm profits, less fuel use, reduced chemical use from more precise application, and increased types of land available for organic farming.

== History ==
David Dowler was a pioneer of wide span vehicle farming and created a first prototype gantry, called P1, in January 1978. Dowler went on to build and apply for patents on many wide span-related machines.
