= Point source pollution =

Single identifiable source

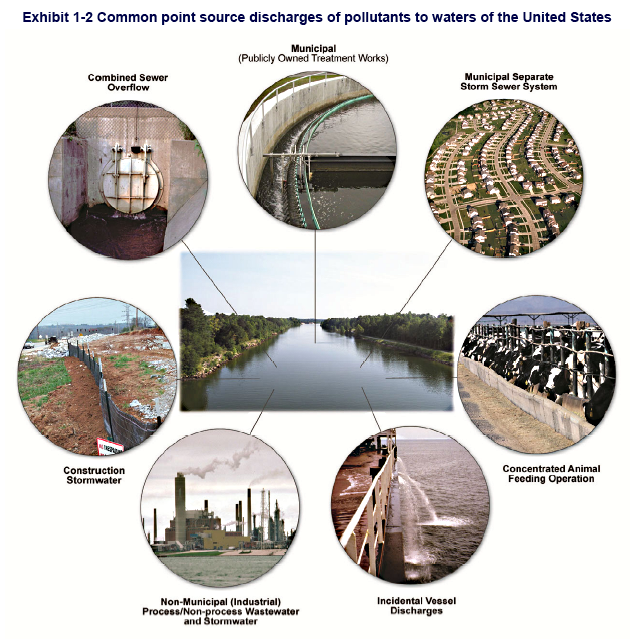
Water pollution point sources

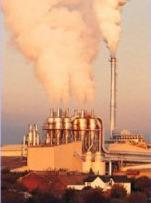
Air pollution point sources

A point source of pollution is a single identifiable source of air, water, thermal, noise or light pollution. A point source has negligible extent, distinguishing it from other pollution source geometrics (such as nonpoint source or area source). The sources are called point sources because in mathematical modeling, they can be approximated as a mathematical point to simplify analysis. Pollution point sources are identical to other physics, engineering, optics, and chemistry point sources and include:

- Air pollution from an industrial source (rather than an airport or a road, considered a line source, or a forest fire, which is considered an area source, or volume source)
- Water pollution from factories, power plants, municipal sewage treatment plants and some farms (see concentrated animal feeding operation). The U.S. Clean Water Act also defines municipal separate storm sewer systems and industrial stormwater discharges (such as construction sites) as point sources.
  - Man-made, natural, and groundwater reservoirs can all be contaminated by point source pollution which can threaten human health and safety.
- Noise pollution from a jet engine
- Disruptive seismic vibration from a localized seismic study
- Light pollution from an intrusive street light
- Radio emissions from an interference-producing electrical device

== See also ==
- Nonpoint source pollution
- United States regulation of point source water pollution
