= Sunnyvale ESL shooting =

Mass shooting in Sunnyvale, California, United States

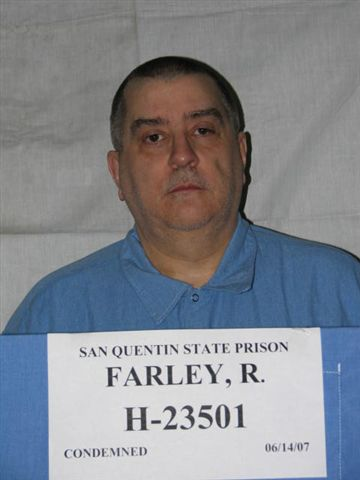
- Mug shot of Richard Farley in 2007
- Location: 37.4114°N 122.0124°W; Sunnyvale, California, U.S.
- Date: February 16, 1988 c. 2:50 p.m. – 4:30 p.m. (CST)
- Target: Former co-workers
- Attack type: Mass shooting, workplace shooting, mass murder
- Weapons: 12-gauge Benelli M1 Riot semi-automatic shotgun; .22-250 bolt-action rifle w/ scope; Pump-action shotgun; .22 WMR Sentinel revolver; .357 Magnum Smith & Wesson revolver; .380 Browning semi-automatic pistol; 9mm Smith & Wesson pistol; Hunting knife (unused); Smoke bomb (unused)
- Deaths: 7
- Injuries: 4 (3 by gunfire)
- Perpetrator: Richard Wade Farley
- Motive: Romantic rejection by stalking victim

On February 16, 1988, a mass shooting occurred at the headquarters of ESL Incorporated in Sunnyvale, California, United States, when 39-year-old Richard Farley shot and killed seven people and wounded four others. A former employee of the company, he stalked his co-worker Laura Black for four years beginning in 1984. Farley was convicted of seven counts of first degree murder and sentenced to death.

== Background ==
=== Perpetrator ===
Richard Wade Farley was born in Texas on July 25, 1948. He was the oldest of six children. His father was in the military, therefore the family frequently relocated, and eventually settled in California. He graduated from high school in 1966 and attended Santa Rosa Junior College. Farley then joined the United States Navy in 1967, where he stayed for ten years. After his discharge in 1977, Farley began working as a software technician at ESL Inc., a defense contractor in Sunnyvale, California.

=== Stalking ===
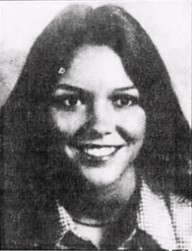
Laura Black, pictured in 1978

In April 1984, 35-year-old Richard Farley met 22-year-old Laura Black, who also worked at ESL Inc. Farley described himself as immediately smitten and later said that he instantly "fell in love" with Black. Farley began leaving gifts, including letters and homemade baked goods, on Laura Black's desk and asked her out numerous times. Black repeatedly refused the invitations and later said in an interview that she "tried really to ignore him but to be cordial". Despite her refusals, Farley persisted; he began calling her desk every few hours as well as showing up at Black's aerobics class. By providing false information to the ESL HR department through pretexting, Farley was able to obtain Black's home address and home phone number. Farley also befriended the custodial department in an attempt to copy keys to Black's desk so he could rifle through her files to gain an insight into her personal life. In addition, he went through her confidential personnel files under false pretenses.

During this time, Farley was sending one or two letters to Black a week. Though there were periods of time during which the letters would cease, in total Farley sent about two hundred letters over a period of four years, with the final letter sent from his prison cell after his rampage at ESL. Black moved four times during those four years, but Farley was able to obtain her address every time. Farley doctored photos of him and Black being together and mailed them to her.

In fall of 1985, Black asked the Human Resources Department at ESL for help. ESL ordered Farley to attend psychological counseling sessions, and despite attending these sessions, his harassment of Black continued. By spring of 1986, Farley was threatening fellow ESL employees. Because of his poor performance, his employment with ESL was terminated in May 1986. He had been working for ESL for nine years and spent several months stalking Black full-time, then found work at a rival company, Covalent Systems Corporation in Sunnyvale.

== Events ==
=== Preparation ===
Black filed for a temporary restraining order against Farley on February 2, 1988, and it was granted by a family court judge the same day or the next day. A court date was set for February 17, 1988, to see if the restraining order should be made permanent.

Farley bought a shotgun and various other weapons and equipment. The restraining order did not prevent him from buying weapons during that time. A search of his residence after the shooting revealed that he also owned a variety of other weapons which were not present during the shooting at ESL, including a Mossberg shotgun barrel, a Ruger .22 LR carbine and over 3,000 rounds of ammunition. On February 9, 1988, he left a package with Black's attorney, claiming to have evidence that he and Black had a longstanding relationship. The package included items such as photographs purportedly showing Black and Farley on dates, a garage door opener to Black's house, and hotel and credit card receipts. Farley claimed that Black kept a stash of cocaine that they shared once. Black's attorney dismissed the package as utter fabrications.

On the day before the court date, February 16, 1988, Farley drove his motorhome to the ESL parking lot in Sunnyvale, California. He later claimed he waited for Black to leave work so he could convince her to rescind the restraining order. If she refused, he would kill himself. At about 2:50 P.M., Farley loaded up his guns, describing his weaponry in his court testimony as a ".380 in front, the ammo pouch in front, .357 magnum to my right side, the .22 magnum behind it, a large buck knife behind that, numerous clips around the other side, and my vest, my nine millimeter, my two shotguns, and I tied a cord around the .22-250 and just draped it over me." When police searched the building after the shooting, they found a Benelli Riot semi-automatic shotgun; a rifle with a scope; a pump-action shotgun; a Sentinel revolver; a Smith & Wesson .357 Magnum revolver; a Browning semiautomatic pistol; a Smith & Wesson pistol; a smoke bomb; a leather glove; a belt with pouches filled with ammunition; other bags containing more than 200 rounds of ammunition; and a vest containing more than 800 rounds of ammunition, wooden matches, a foot-long buck knife and sheath, and ear protectors.

=== Shooting and standoff ===
Carrying over 1,000 rounds of ammunition with him, Farley approached ESL's M-5 Building, intending to make his way to Black's second-floor office. First, he fatally shot Lawrence J. Kane, 46, in the parking lot as he left the building. Farley then turned and fired at Randell Hemingway, who ducked behind his car door. He entered a side door by shooting through the glass of the Mardex Security Door. After entering, Farley killed Wayne "Buddy" Williams Jr. behind his desk near the lobby. He then entered a stairwell where another victim was killed. On the second floor, two men and two women were killed in a hallway as Farley approached Black's office.

Upon arriving at Black's office, Farley opened her door, which she then slammed in his face. He fired a shotgun round through the door, hitting her in the left shoulder and collapsing a lung. The injury sent her unconscious to the floor while Farley moved on. At 3:15 p.m., Farley called emergency services and stated, "I'm the one who's been wasting people." He claimed he was doing it because of Black and the restraining order against him. He also requested that people be kept 300 yards from the M-5 Building.

Farley then held a police SWAT team at bay for six hours by moving from room to room so the SWAT snipers could not target him. For five hours during the standoff, Farley spoke by telephone with Sunnyvale negotiator Lt. Ruben Grijalva, expressing remorse for his actions and repeatedly threatening to commit suicide. He also claimed to have had severe financial difficulties after losing his home, car, and computer and falling $20,000 behind in his taxes. Farley also fired upon computer equipment within the building. At 3:35 P.M., Farley stated, in response to being asked if he would surrender, that he wanted to "gloat a little bit." He also stated that he had enough ammunition to "last two hours" if he fired continuously.

At some point in the siege, Farley allowed longtime friend and former landlady Linda Walden to leave the building. During this exchange, fellow employee Christine Hansen left her hiding spot and also asked to leave, which Farley allowed. At several points, he told Grijalva that he did not plan to leave ESL alive and, at one period, claimed that he had changed the beneficiary of his life insurance policy from Black to his girlfriend, Mei Chang. At 4:30 P.M., Farley agreed to allow officers to rescue wounded individuals on the first floor. Negotiators also obtained audio recording of the conversations, where Farley stated, "There's no more reason to harm anybody; I've run out of enthusiasm for things really." He also expressed regret for shooting Black and asked about her well-being. He claimed that he wanted Black to live so she could regret what happened. Despite this, Farley never expressed remorse for the seven victims he killed and claimed he shot them because they were a threat. Meanwhile, Black regained consciousness and managed to prevent her wound from bleeding further while she and other survivors hid from Farley. Black and other survivors eventually escaped.

At approximately 8:30 p.m., Farley surrendered to police after requesting a sandwich and a soft drink. Seven people were killed by Farley's shotgun blasts with four more wounded, including Black. 98 rounds were fired.

== Victims ==
Dead

- Lawrence J. Kane, 46, from San Jose
- Wayne "Buddy" Williams Jr., 23, from San Jose
- Ronald G. Doney, 36, from Manteca
- Joseph Lawrence Silva, 43
- Glenda Moritz, 27
- Ronald Steven Reed, 26
- Helen Lamparter, 49, from Sunnyvale

Injured

- Laura Black; shot in the shoulder
- Gregory Scott; shot in the forehead
- Richard Townsley; shot in the chest
- Patty Marcott; broken arm while fleeing

== Aftermath ==
The next day, court commissioner Lois Kittle made the restraining order against Farley permanent and commented, "Pieces of paper do not stop bullets."

Black survived, but was hospitalized for nineteen days. She continued to work for the same company. Farley wrote to her again from his prison cell, claiming that she had finally won.

During trial, Farley admitted to the killings, but pleaded not guilty, claiming that he never planned to kill but only wished to get Black's attention or commit suicide in front of her for rejecting him. His attorney claimed that Farley was never a violent man and only had his judgment temporarily clouded by his obsession with Black, and that he would likely never kill again. Prior to the shooting, Farley did not have a criminal record.

The prosecution documented every step of the stalking, produced all the letters he sent, and documented his shotgun and ammunition purchases a week before his rampage at ESL, as well as his other weapons. All this amounted to extensive planning, which they claimed was evidence of premeditation.

On October 21, 1991, Farley was found guilty of all seven counts of first degree murder. On January 17, 1992, Superior Court Judge Joseph Biafore Jr. sentenced him to death. Because of California law, there were several automatic appeals. On January 22, 1992, Farley was admitted to San Quentin State Prison. On July 2, 2009, the California Supreme Court upheld Farley's death sentence (People v Richard Farley (2009) 46 Cal.4th 1053). Farley remained on death row at San Quentin State Prison, as CDCR number H23501, until April 2024, when he was moved to California Health Care Facility as part of a larger transfer of former death row inmates.

On August 9, 2024, district attorney Jeff Rosen sought to reduce Farley's sentence to life without parole. On December 6, 2024, a Santa Clara County judge delayed a ruling in the resentencing case to March 2025 to allow more victims to speak out. On March 21, 2025, a judge ruled that Farley’s death sentence would remain instated, following victim testimony.

The massacre helped prompt California's 1990 passage of the first anti-stalking laws in the U.S.

== In media ==
A movie, I Can Make You Love Me (also known as Stalking Laura in the United Kingdom) was made in 1993. Brooke Shields played Black and Richard Thomas played Farley. Farley's case is also analyzed by forensic psychiatrist Michael H. Stone in his 2009 book The Anatomy of Evil.

== See also ==
- List of death row inmates in the United States § California
- List of homicides in California
- List of rampage killers (workplace killings)
