= Area source pollution =

2D source of pollution emissions

Area sources are sources of pollution that consist of many smaller emitters that are distributed across a geographic area. Examples of area sources include gas stations, dry-cleaners, print shops, autobody shops, furniture manufacturers, and home sources such as wood stoves, pesticides, and cleaners. As defined by the Environmental Protection Agency, to qualify as an area source, the source must emit less than 10 tons of a hazardous air pollutant, or HAP, per year. If the source is emitting numerous HAPs, then the emissions should not exceed 25 tons cumulatively. Area sources contribute to 26 percent of all man-made air toxic emissions according to EPA estimates. Area sources differ from major point sources, for point sources emit over 10 tons of one or over 25 of numerous hazardous air pollutants. These major point sources are one single identifiable emitter, such as power plants and refineries. Although individual area sources emit small quantities of pollutants, they are spread out across regions and are found in large numbers. This results in a substantial contribution to air pollution.

== Air pollution ==
For example, area sources of air pollution are air pollutant emission sources which operate within a specific geographic area. Locomotives operating on certain linear tracks are examples of a line source, whereas locomotives operating within a railyard are an example of an area source of pollution, for they are confined to one geographic area. The EPA has identified a list of roughly 70 area sources that are responsible for emitting the most urban air toxics. A few of these area source standard categories are:

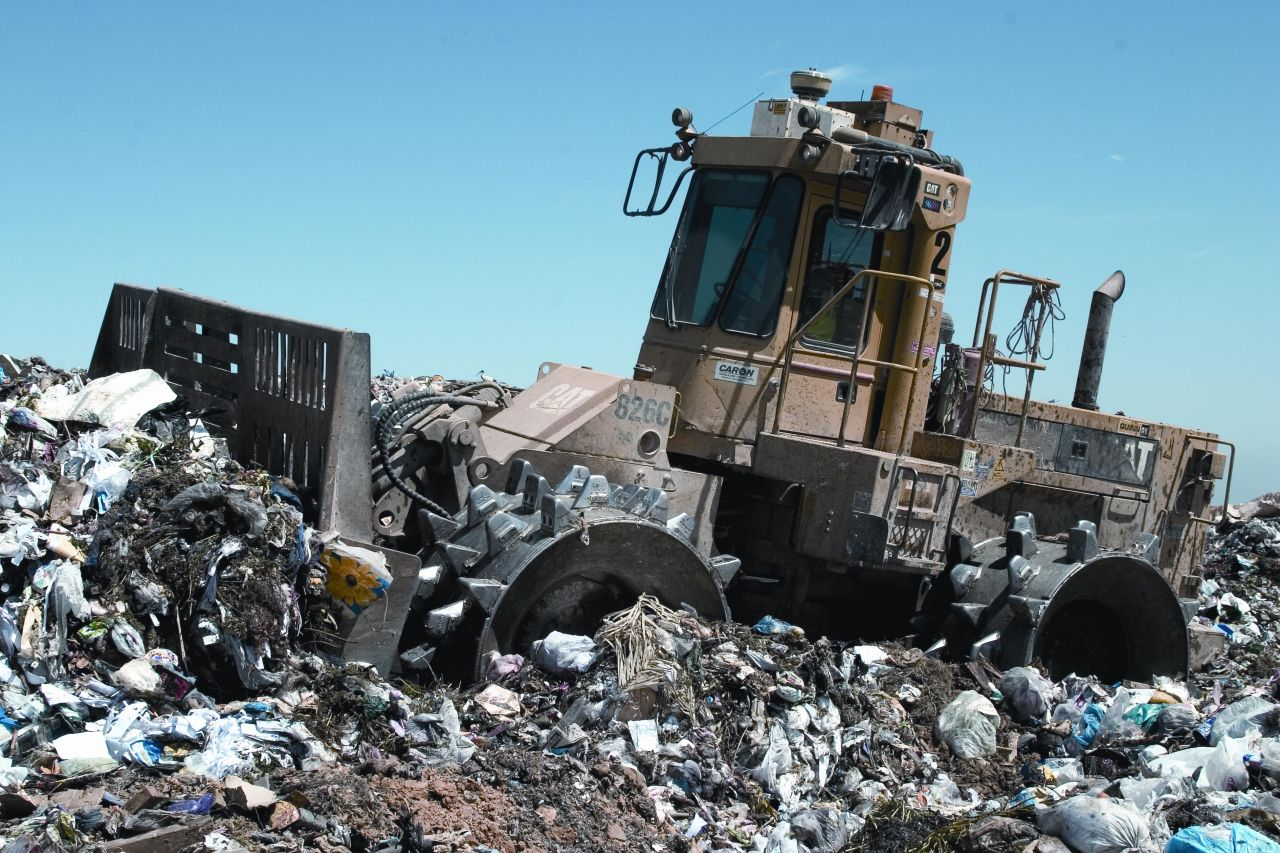
Municipal Landfill, an example of an area source that emits HAPs

- Chemical Preparations Industry
- Hazardous Waste Incineration
- Manufacturing Facilities
- Dry cleaning Facilities
- Municipal Landfills
- Hospital Ethylene Oxide Sterilizers
- Oil and Natural gas Production
- Gasoline Dispensing Facilities

== Environmental and health impacts ==
Human exposure to most HAPs comes from breathing in air containing them, as well as the ingestion of waters where HAPs have been deposited. Some toxicants may stay in the air and affect populations via inhalation. On the other hand, other HAPs can be deposited into soil and water through precipitation. Some pollutants may later be re-evaporated into the atmosphere, while others remain in the soil or water and may be taken up by plants and animals. This process may lead to the presence of HAPs in the food chain, therefore affecting certain populations via ingestion. Thirty more common chemicals in HAPs can enter different body parts, affecting the correspnding bodily functions. Functions affected and to what extent depend on the duration of exposure, the amount of toxicant in an air sample in the area, and how harmful the chemical is. Exposure to HAPs from area sources of pollution have been associated with many minor and some serious adverse health effects. Some serious health effects that HAPs may cause are cancer, birth defects, and blood disorders. HAPs that have been classified as national cancer contributors include 1,3-butadiene, acetaldehyde, benzene, carbon tetrachloride, ethylene oxide, and naphthalene. Thirty in 1 million people were found to develop cancer due to air toxicant exposure. An analysis of EPA data found that ingestion was the more dominant form of exposure over inhalation, with ingestion being the mechanism in which individuals are exposed to over 20% of air toxics. HAPs may also cause immune system, reproductive system, and respiratory system damage. Minor health effects include skin and eye irritation, nausea, headaches, fatigue, and changes in behavior.

Specific toxicants that contribute to air and occupational pollution, such as particulate matter (PM_{2.5}) can cause and exacerbate numerous respiratory diseases. Worldwide, air pollution has been found to lead to 3.3 million premature deaths per year. This is due to the increase in asthma attacks and chronic obstructive pulmonary diseases that PM_{2.5} causes. Long term minimal exposure to particulate matter over the course of 8 years has shown to negatively affect lung function development in children. Other toxicants such as asbestos cause other conditions such as lung cancer, silicosis, and pneumoconiosis. The typical air pollutants, besides PM_{2.5}, are gases, hydrocarbons, and volatile organic compounds.

== Environmental Justice Considerations ==
Area sources such as municipal landfills, hazardous waste incinerators, and manufacturing facilities contribute a substantial amount to the release of HAPs into the atmosphere, negatively impacting the environment. Data has shown that there are certain populations who are more vulnerable to these toxicants due to the co-location of these sources in predominantly rural and poor communities of color. Area sources contribute largely to climate change and environmental inequality.

Landfills, in particular, have been identified as drivers of global climate change. They also generate toxic smells, unsafe water and land conditions, and air, noise, and water pollution. Municipal landfills are one of 3 types of landfills (C&D, industrial, municipal) that consist of 93% of landfills in the U.S. Host counties for landfills have been found to be environmental justice communities. A higher percent population of African American individuals in a certain community increases the likelihood of living in a landfill host county. The percent population of Hispanic individuals was also found to have a correlation between a higher likelihood of the county hosting a municipal landfill. Socioeconomic status showed a trend as well. With an increased median household income of a certain population, there is a decreased likelihood of that community hosting a landfill. One study determined that female-householder families were more impacted by landfills. Gender interacts with other determinants such as race and socioeconomic status, and this intersectionalty of exacerbating factors disproportionately affects vulnerable populations. Waste is also transported to host counties, therefore these counties must experience effects caused by waste from elsewhere. Waste travels long distances to disposal sites, increasing transport emissions and contributing to climate change. Manufacturing facilities released over 2.2 billion pounds of toxic chemicals into the environment, which is detrimental to the health of populations living in the vicinity of landfills. The individuals with the highest risk of exposure were those living within the radius distance between numerous different sites.

Similar patterns of environmental burden have also been observed for other area sources. These patterns are similar for incinerators, another area source producing numerous HAPs. There are several health effects of incineration facilities. Residence near an incinerator was found to have an association with birth defects in children. Specific HAPs released such as arsenic, lead, mercury, and cadmium can be fragmented and found in soil and water. These HAPs were found to lead to diagnoses of brain cancer in children and increased risk for mothers during pregnancy, as well as malformations in the cardiac and circulatory systems.

A possible explanation for areas such as the southeast becoming landfill hotspots is due to land-use patterns that follow the logic of historically racially segregated land.

== Occupational Exposure to HAPs ==
The International Labor Association (ILO) found that 1 billion workers each year face adverse health effects due to their exposure to pollutants from their work environments. One million workers die per year, along with several million who suffer due to exposure to hazardous chemicals. This chemical exposure primarily leads to respiratory diseases, cardiovascular diseases, genitourinary diseases, and neurological conditions. Work related asthma (WRA) is the most The leading cause of death from the constant exposure to toxic chemicals that some occupations face is cancer, with numerous HAPs contributing to a list of over 200 substances that are possible carcinogens. Product manufacturing continues to require more hazardous chemicals, so the amount of toxins produced will increase. This will lead to an even higher disease burden and numerous adverse environmental impacts.

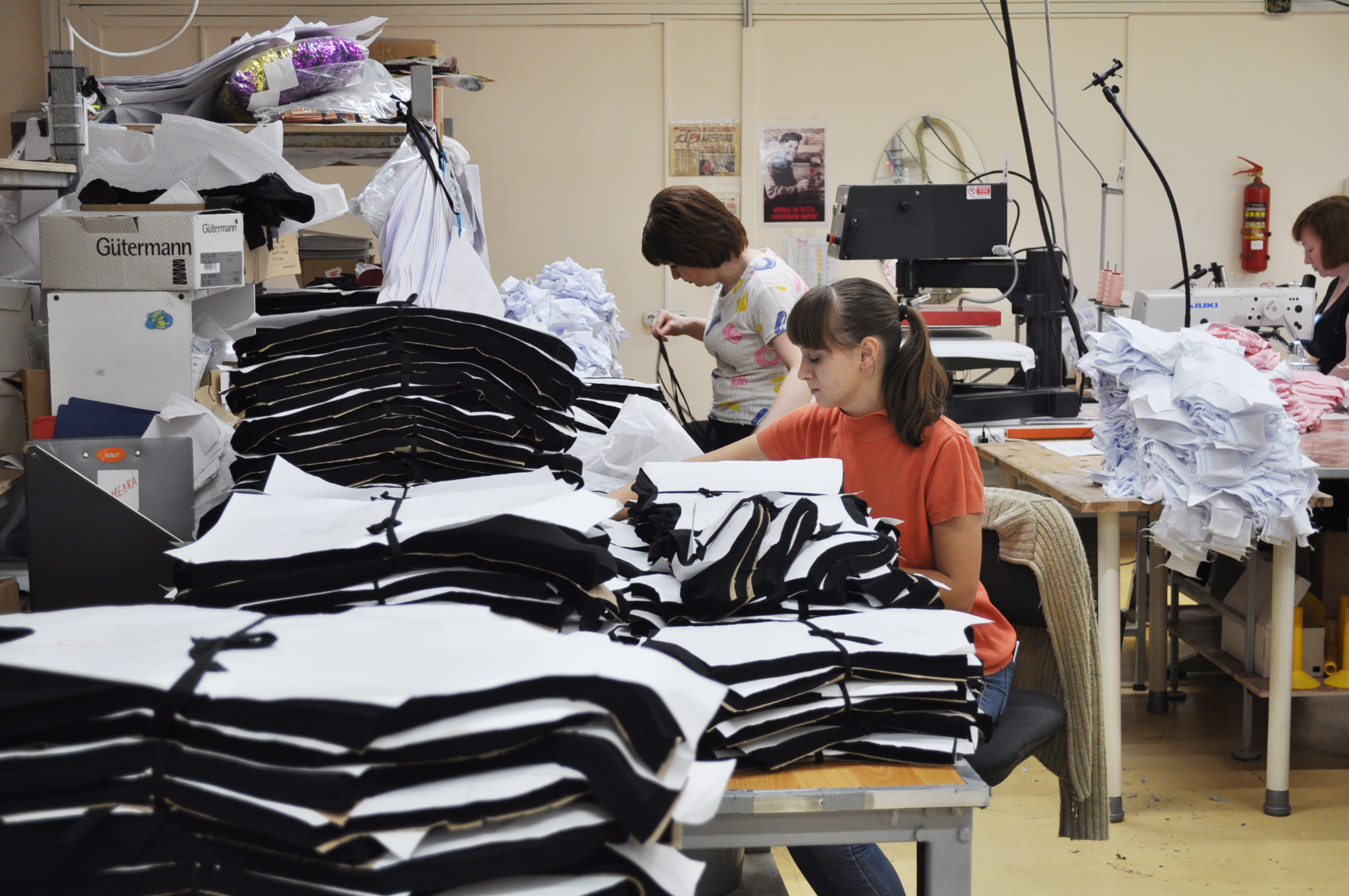
Workers in manufacturing facility, illustrating occupational exposure to HAPs from area sources

The second most affected occupational industry is manufacturing, with 59% of individuals in manufacturing occupations affected by chemicals. Healthcare workers, construction workers, and storage workers are other highly affected groups. Those in manufacturing face constant exposure to dust, fumes, gases, chemicals, and other cosmetics. In the healthcare industry, transportation, waste, and sanitizing agents all contribute to the release of HAPs into the atmosphere. Chemical manufacturing was found to be the highest contributor of air toxins in the environment and of the most adverse occupational health impacts. The most vulnerable groups impacted are migrant workers, indigenous people, women, and children.

With new chemical introduced each year, the implementation of certain policies that attempt to regulate the amount of exposure workers face are not able to keep up with increasing toxin production.

== Regulation and Policy Implementation ==
There are numerous policies that play a role in controlling area source emissions and reducing individuals' exposure to HAPs and adverse environmental impacts. The Clean Air Act provides the general framework to regulate air emissions from area sources and the amount of HAPs that are released into the atmosphere. It focuses on both stationary and mobile sources. Implementation of environmental policies, such as the Clean Air Act, can be harder in certain industries, with certain communities disproportionately impacted by HAPs. There is little research on violations of the Clean Air Act. It can be found that the highest priority violations of the act occur in communities of color in the United States.

There are also models used to minimize occupational risks. The Occupational Safety and Health Administration has a model including engineering and administrative controls, as well as the use of personal protective equipment (PPE). One engineering control is gas detectors to ensure that levels do not exceed limits. If levels exceed limits, gas detectors ensure proper evacuation and remediation.

== Water pollution ==
Water pollution manifestations of an area source—often called nonpoint source pollution—include:

- Surface runoff of fertilizer or pesticides from rainfall or irrigation water
- Widespread failure of a septic drain field
- Dispersal of an oil spill in a water body.

In the early 1970s computer models were developed to analyze the transport of runoff carrying water pollutants, which considered dissolution rates of various chemicals, infiltration into soils and ultimate pollutant load delivered to receiving waters. One of the earliest models addressing chemical dissolution in runoff and resulting transport was developed in the early 1970s by the United States Environmental Protection Agency. This computer model formed the basis of much of the regulatory framework that led to strategies for water pollution control via land use and chemical handling techniques.

== See also ==
- Air pollution dispersion terminology
- Atmospheric dispersion modeling
- List of atmospheric dispersion models
- Line source
- Point source (pollution)
- Roadway air dispersion modeling
- Volume source (pollution)
