= Volume source (pollution) =

3D source of pollutant emissions

A volume source of pollution is a three-dimensional source of pollutant emissions. Essentially, it is an area source with a third dimension.

Examples of a volume source of pollution are:

- Dust emissions from the wind erosion of uncovered gravel piles, sand piles, limestone piles, coal piles, etc.
- Fugitive gaseous emissions from pipe flanges, packed valve seals, gas compressor seals, control valve seals, piping and vessel seals within industrial facilities such as oil refineries and petrochemical plants.
- Buildings, containing air pollutant emission sources, with no singular emission vent (i.e., buildings with multiple roof vents or multiple open windows), such as in an urban area.

== See also ==
- Air pollution dispersion terminology
- Area source
- Atmospheric dispersion modeling
- List of atmospheric dispersion models
- Line source
- Point source (pollution)
- Roadway air dispersion modeling
