= Line source =

Line from which something (air, noise, radiation, etc.) emanates

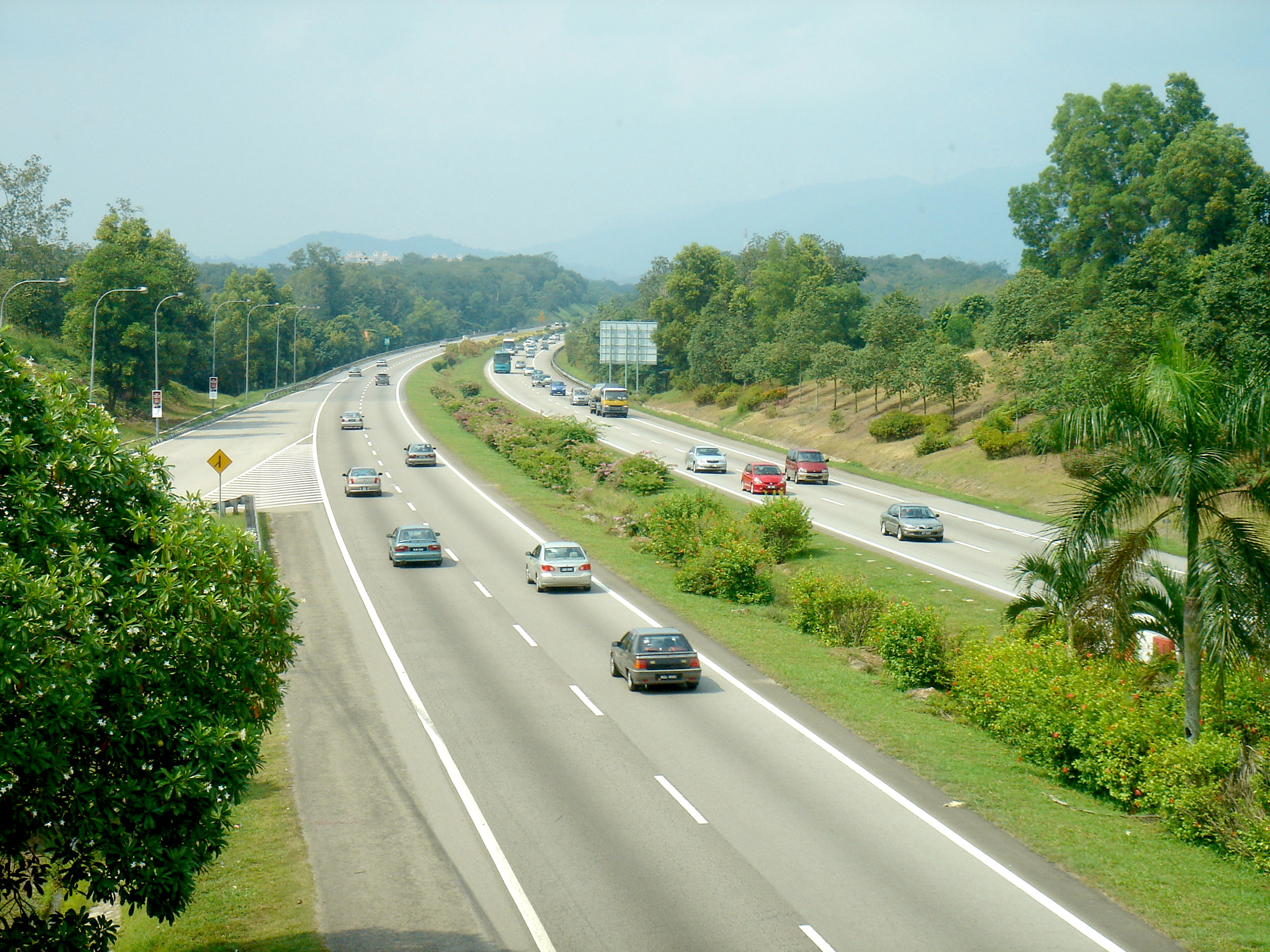
North–South Expressway in Malaysia. A roadway can be a line source of air and noise pollution and need not be a straight line.

A line source, as opposed to a point source, area source, or volume source, is a source of air, noise, water contamination or electromagnetic radiation that emanates from a linear (one-dimensional) geometry. The most prominent linear sources are roadway air pollution, aircraft air emissions, roadway noise, certain types of water pollution sources that emanate over a range of river extent rather than from a discrete point, elongated light tubes, certain dose models in medical physics and electromagnetic antennas. While point sources of pollution were studied since the late nineteenth century, linear sources did not receive much attention from scientists until the late 1960s, when environmental regulations for highways and airports began to emerge. At the same time, computers with the processing power to accommodate the data processing needs of the computer models required to tackle these one-dimensional sources became more available.

In addition, this era of the 1960s saw the first emergence of environmental scientists who spanned the disciplines required to accomplish these studies. For example, meteorologists, chemists, and computer scientists in the air pollution field were required to build complex models to address roadway air dispersion modeling. Prior to the 1960s, these specialities tended to work within their own disciplines, but with the advent of NEPA, the Clean Air Act, the Noise Control Act in the United States, and other seminal legislation, the era of multidisciplinary environmental science had begun.

For electromagnetic linear sources, the principal early advances in computer modeling arose in the Soviet Union and USA when the end of World War II and the Cold War were fought partially by progress in electronic warfare, including the technologies of active antenna arrays.

== Linear air pollution source ==
Air pollution levels near major highways and urban arterials are in violation of U.S. National Ambient Air Quality Standards where millions of Americans live or work. Even the interior of a building does not really protect inhabitants from adverse exterior air quality, since the exterior air is the intake supply, and it is well known that indoor air quality is typically worse than exterior air.

A roadway travelled by motor vehicles can be idealized by a line source emitting air pollutants. This mathematical problem was first solved in 1970 by a collaboration of physics, mathematics and computer science. The original theory assumed steady-state traffic conditions and meteorology on a perfectly straight roadway. Currently the models have evolved to treat variable meteorology, time-variant traffic operations and complex roadbed geometries. Current technology allows highway designers and city planners to analyze alternative roadway development plans and assess air quality impacts. The same basic model theory can be applied to airport operations, since the linear source is merely an inclined line. In the early 1970s these ESL models were refined into area source models to account for the finite width of the roadway.

== Linear noise source ==
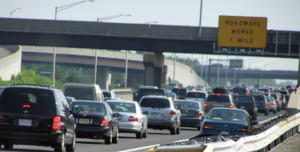
The New Jersey Turnpike was one of the earliest line sources analyzed for noise

Roadway noise is the most important example of a linear noise source, since it comprises about 80 percent of the environmental noise exposure for humans worldwide. In the 1960s, when computer modeling of this phenomenon was perfected, the first applications of linear source noise modeling became systematic. After passage of the National Environmental Policy Act and Noise Control Act, the demand for detailed analysis soared, and decision makers began to look to acoustical scientists for answers regarding the planning of new roadways and the design of noise mitigation. The intensity of roadway noise is governed by the following variables: traffic operations (speed, truck mix, age of vehicle fleet), roadway surface type, tire types, roadway geometrics, terrain, micrometeorology and the geometry of area structures.

Due to the complexity of the variables, a line source acoustic model must be a computer model that can analyze sound levels in the vicinity of roadways. The first meaningful models arose in the late 1960s and early 1970s. Two of the leading research teams were BBN in Boston and ESL Inc. of Sunnyvale, California. Both of these groups developed complex mathematical models to allow the study of alternate roadway designs, traffic operations and noise mitigation strategies in an arbitrary setting. Later model alterations have come into widespread use among state Departments of Transportation and city planners, but the accuracy of early models has had little change in 40 years.

Generally line source acoustic models trace sound ray bundles and calculate spreading loss along with ray bundle divergence (or convergence} from refractive phenomena. Diffraction is usually addressed by establishing secondary emitters at any points of topographic or anthropomorphic “sharpness” (such as noise barriers or building surfaces. Meteorology can be addressed in a statistical manner allowing for actual wind rose and wind speed statistics (along with thermocline data).

== Water pollution line source ==
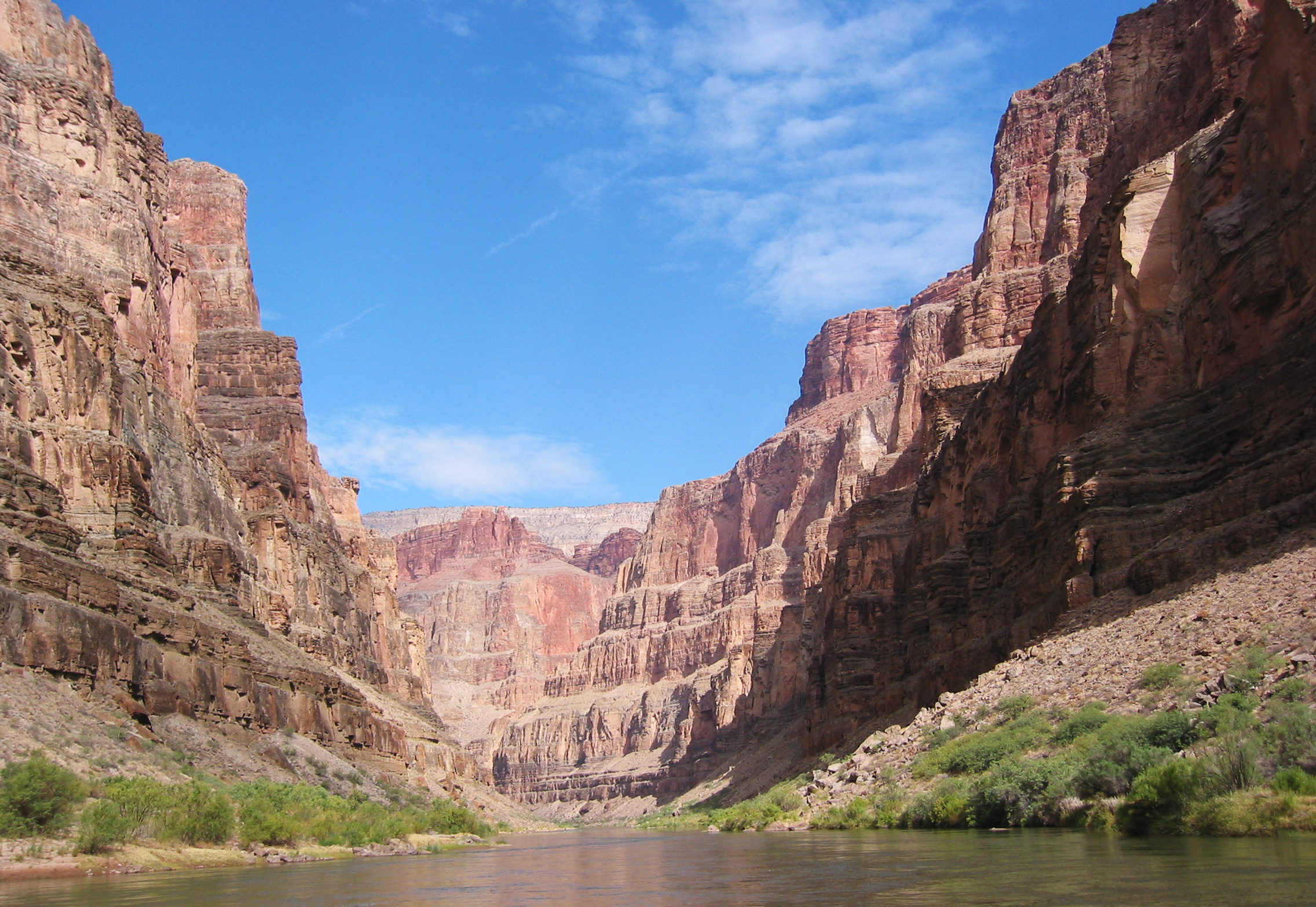
Colorado River, receiving effectively a linear source of silt from the sides of the Grand Canyon.

Less common are line source applications in the field of water pollutant dispersal. This phenomenon generally arises when surface runoff scours soil contaminants from upper soil layers and transports these pollutants to a linear receiving water, such as a river. The underlying land management practices which lead to such sources of water pollution are logging, pesticide application, construction grading, slash-and-burn activity and urban stormwater runoff.

Again computer models are needed to address the complexity of such an extended linear discharge into a dynamic medium such as flowing water. The resulting surface runoff water carrying pollutants may be considered a line source discharging into a river or stream. The chemical composition of this surface runoff may be characterized by a surface runoff model such as the USGS runoff precipitation algorithm, while the instream transport may be analyzed by a dynamic river pollutant model such as DSSAM.

== Light emission line source ==
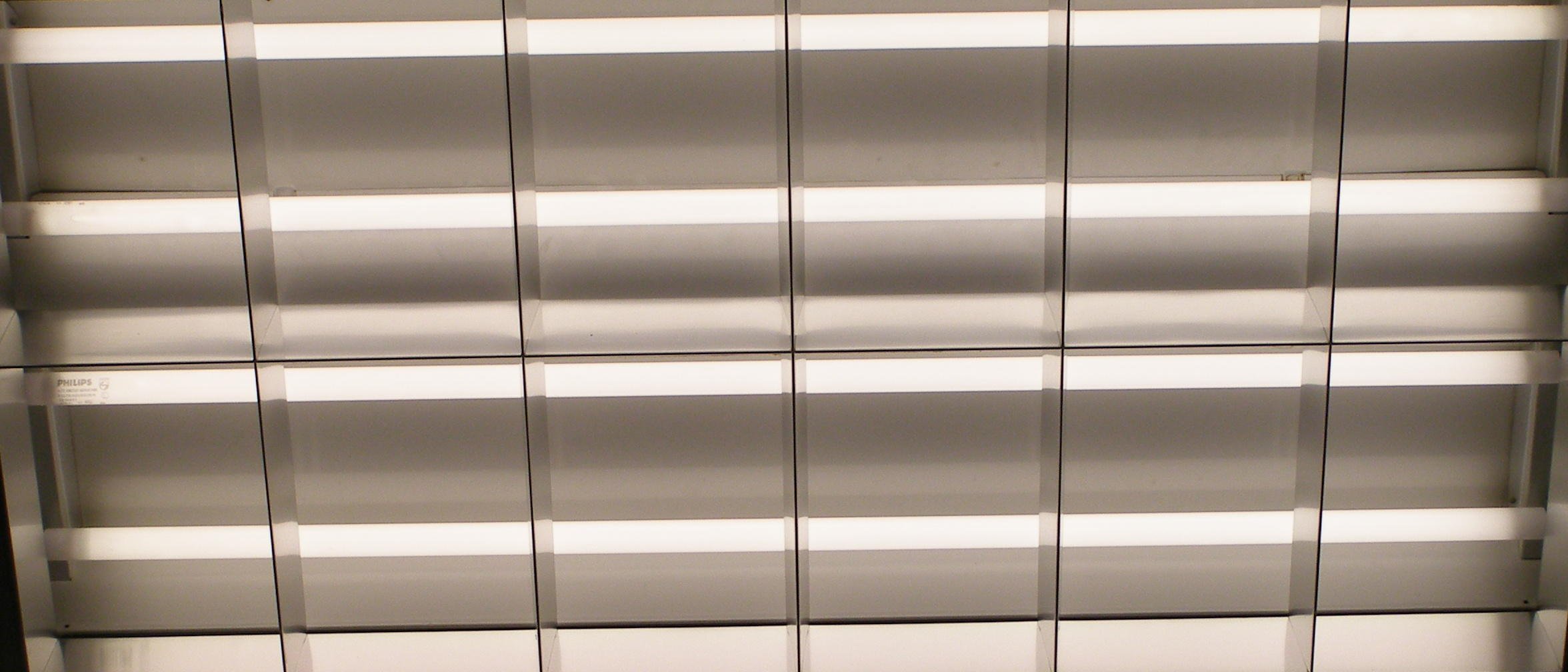
Common T8 fluorescent lighting tubes used in office environments

In the study of illumination, a variety of sources are linear in nature, most commonly the fluorescent tube, During the process of interior lighting design it is important to calculate the light intensity at work stations or other user areas, not only to ensure sufficient light is present, but more importantly to avoid over-illumination and its attendant energy wastage as well as adverse health effects. Thus the scientists involved in light transmission calculations employ computer models that recognize linear sources when fluorescent fixtures are used. In a typical setting there may be hundreds of finite length light sources that comprise the light output in an office environment. A related concept are the ultraviolet tubes used in phototherapy, where output radiation from the tube can be accurately modeled by treating the tube as a line source. On a larger scale, an illuminated roadway may act as a line source of light pollution.

== See also ==
- Air pollution dispersion terminology
- Area source (pollution)
- Atmospheric dispersion modeling
- Effluent
- Fenceline community
- Line array
- List of atmospheric dispersion models
- Phased array
- Point source (pollution)
- Roadway noise
- Surface runoff
- Volume source (pollution)
