= CTAG =

CTAG is a computational fluid dynamics model for the behaviour of air pollutants on and near roadways.

CTAG stands for Comprehensive Turbulent Aerosol Dynamics and Gas Chemistry, is an environmental turbulent reacting flow model designed to simulate the transport and transformation of air pollutants in complex environments. It is developed by the Energy and the Environmental Research Laboratory ( EERL) at Cornell University.

CTAG’s plume transport model designed for on-road and near-road applications is called CFD-VIT-RIT. CTAG has been applied to investigate the plume dispersion near different highway configurations, chemical evolution of nitrogen oxides near roadways, spatial variations of air pollutants in highway-building environments, and effects of vegetation barriers on near-road air quality.
