= Point source =

Single, negligibly-sized object from which light, sound, energy, etc. emanates

A point source is a single identifiable localized source of something. A point source has a negligible extent, distinguishing it from other source geometries. Sources are called point sources because, in mathematical modeling, these sources can usually be approximated as a mathematical point to simplify analysis.

The actual source need not be physically small if its size is negligible relative to other length scales in the problem. For example, in astronomy, stars are routinely treated as point sources, even though they are in actuality much larger than the Earth.

In three dimensions, the density of something leaving a point source decreases in proportion to the inverse square of the distance from the source, if the distribution is isotropic, and there is no absorption or other loss.

== Mathematics ==
In mathematics, a point source is a singularity from which flux or flow is emanating. Although singularities such as this do not exist in the observable universe, mathematical point sources are often used as approximations to reality in physics and other fields.

== Visible electromagnetic radiation (light) ==
Generally, a source of light can be considered a point source if the resolution of the imaging instrument is too low to resolve the source's apparent size. There are two types and sources of light: a point source and an extended source.

Mathematically an object may be considered a point source if its angular size, $\theta$, is much smaller than the resolving power of the telescope:
$\theta << \lambda / D$,
where $\lambda$ is the wavelength of light and $D$ is the telescope diameter.

Examples:

- Light from a distant star seen through a small telescope
- Light passing through a pinhole or other small aperture, viewed from a distance much greater than the size of the hole
- Light from a street light in a large-scale study of light pollution or street illumination

== Other electromagnetic radiation ==
Radio wave sources that are smaller than one radio wavelength are also generally treated as point sources. Radio emissions generated by a fixed electrical circuit are usually polarized, producing anisotropic radiation. If the propagating medium is lossless, however, the radiant power in the radio waves at a given distance will still vary as the inverse square of the distance if the angle remains constant to the source polarization.

Gamma ray and X-ray sources may be treated as a point source if sufficiently small. Radiological contamination and nuclear sources are often point sources. This has significance in health physics and radiation protection.

Examples:

- Radio antennas are often smaller than one wavelength, even though they are many meters across
- Pulsars are treated as point sources when observed using radio telescopes
- In nuclear physics, a "hot spot" is a point source of radiation

== Sound ==
Sound is an oscillating pressure wave. As the pressure oscillates up and down, an audio point source acts in turn as a fluid point source and then a fluid point sink. (Such an object does not exist physically, but is often a good simplified model for calculations.)

Examples:

- Seismic vibration from a localised seismic experiment searching for oil
- Noise pollution from a jet engine in a large-scale study of noise pollution
- A loudspeaker may be considered as a point source in a study of the acoustics of airport announcements

A coaxial loudspeaker is designed to work as a point source to allow a wider field for listening.

== Ionizing radiation ==
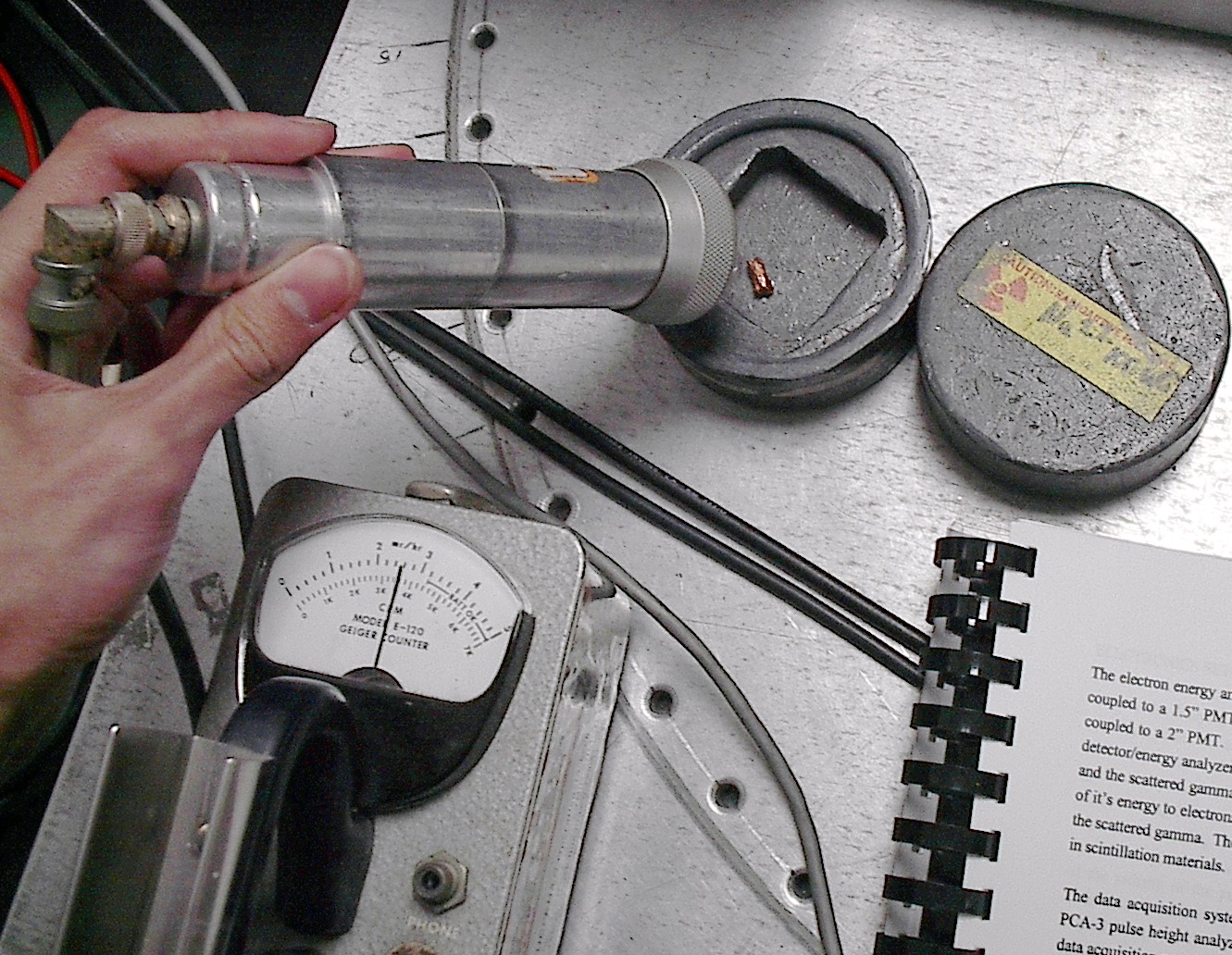
Geiger-Müller counter with dual counts/dose rate display measuring a "point source".

Point sources are used as a means of calibrating ionizing radiation instruments. They are usually sealed capsules and are most commonly used for gamma, x-ray and beta-measuring instruments.

== Heat ==
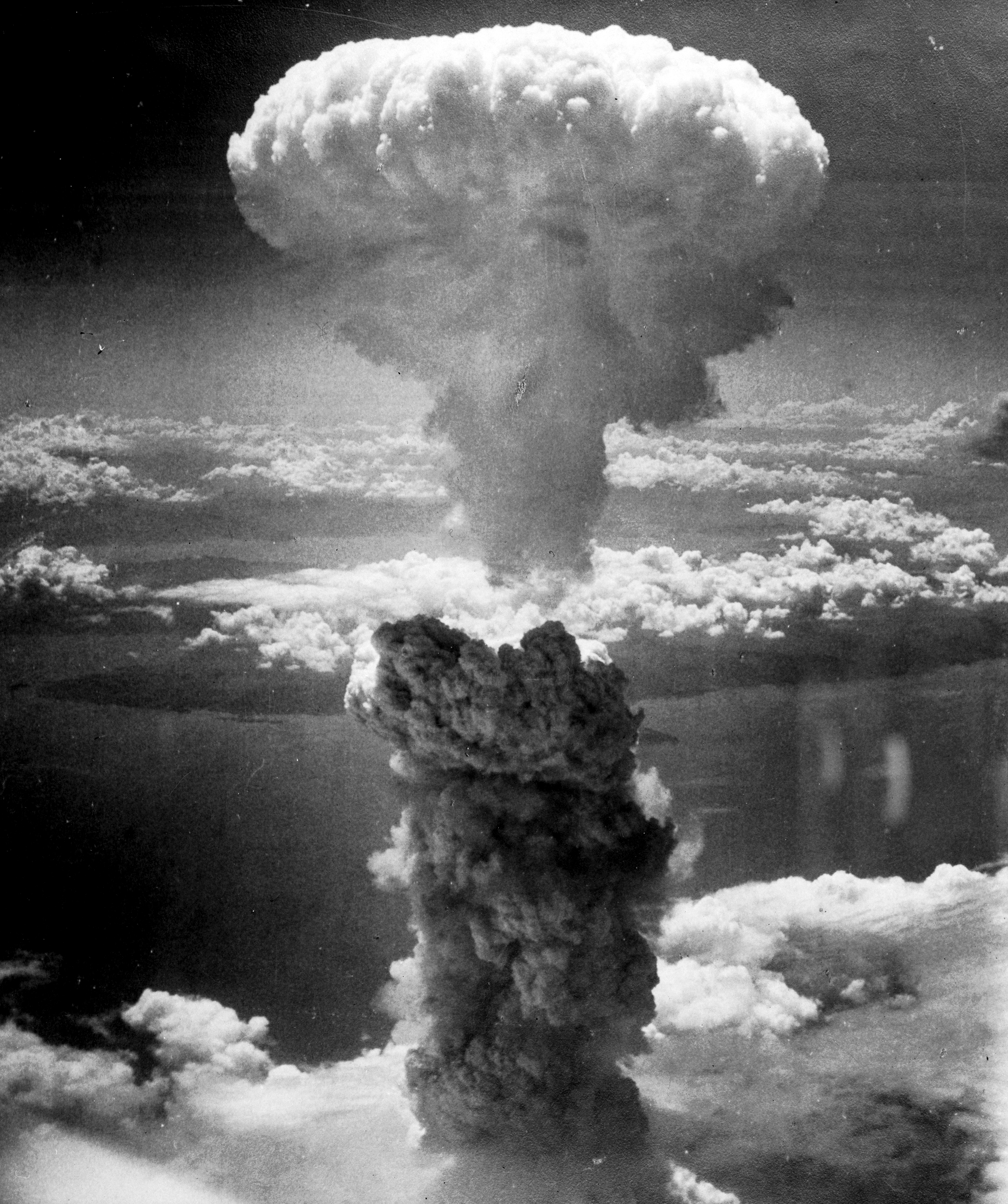
A mushroom cloud as an example of a thermal plume. A nuclear explosion can be treated as a thermal point source in large-scale atmospheric simulations.

In a vacuum, heat escapes as radiation isotropically. If the source remains stationary in a compressible fluid such as air, flow patterns can form around the source due to convection, leading to an anisotropic pattern of heat loss. The most common form of anisotropy is the formation of a thermal plume above the heat source. Examples:

- Geological hotspots on the surface of the Earth which lie at the tops of thermal plumes rising from deep inside the Earth
- Plumes of heat studied in thermal pollution tracking.

== Fluid ==
Fluid point sources are commonly used in fluid dynamics and aerodynamics. A point source of fluid is the inverse of a fluid point sink (a point where fluid is removed). Whereas fluid sinks exhibit complex rapidly changing behavior such as is seen in vortices (for example water running into a plug-hole or tornadoes generated at points where air is rising), fluid sources generally produce simple flow patterns, with stationary isotropic point sources generating an expanding sphere of new fluid. If the fluid is moving (such as wind in air or currents in water) a plume is generated from the point source.

Examples:

- Air pollution from a power plant flue gas stack in a large-scale analysis of air pollution
- Water pollution from an oil refinery wastewater discharge outlet in a large-scale analysis of water pollution
- Gas escaping from a pressurized pipe in a laboratory
- Smoke is often released from point sources in a wind tunnel in order to create a plume of smoke which highlights the flow of the wind over an object
- Smoke from a localized chemical fire can be blown in the wind to form a plume of pollution

== Pollution ==
Sources of various types of pollution are often considered as point sources in large-scale studies of pollution.

== See also ==
- Line source
- Dirac delta function
