= Arlington Coalition on Transportation =

The Arlington Coalition on Transportation (ACT) is a citizens group formed to oppose the construction of Interstate 66 through Arlington, Virginia. The focal activity of ACT was the conduct of a lawsuit filed against the Virginia Department of Transportation in 1971 in district court. This small citizen's group, founded by Jim and Emelia Govan, actually defeated the powerful Virginia Highway Commission, as the agency was then known. After considerable further legal and technical struggles, a compromise solution was reached to create a scaled-down highway segment, including a transit element.

== Early history of the I-66 conflict ==
In the year 1956 the Virginia Highway Commission (later the Virginia Department of Transportation) proposed Interstate 66 to link Washington, D.C. to the planned Interstate 81, a total project length of 76 miles. The citizens of Arlington were concerned about the impacts of this project through their county, especially with regard to air quality, noise and community disruption. In 1971, ACT was the plaintiff in an action against the Virginia Highway Commission, having filed a suit in the U.S. district court. ACT won this case after a decision by the United States Court of Appeals for the Fourth Circuit, Arlington Coalition on Transportation v. Volpe, 458 F.2d 1323 (4th Cir.), cert. denied, 409 U.S. 1000 (1972). The court paid special attention to the plaintiff's expert calculations and testimony projecting that air quality levels would violate Federal ambient air quality standards as set forth in the Clean Air Act and violate United States Department of Housing and Urban Development guidelines for ambient noise.

The Washington Post, which paid little attention to the conflict, suddenly became a supporter of Arlington Coalition on Transportation after their stunning victory in the Fourth Circuit. Studies of air quality and noise continued under the direction of ESL Inc., who this time were working directly for the Virginia Department of Transportation under the agreement reached between plaintiff and defendant. These studies, part of the court-mandated environmental impact statement, led to further highway design mitigation, particularly related to acoustical impacts.

The conflict continued into the mid-1970s, until Secretary of Transportation William T. Coleman intervened to mediate the dispute and arrived at the "Coleman Decision," which amounted to a reduced four-lane highway with a Washington Metro element.

== Events to current times ==
The four lane version of Interstate 66 was completed through Arlington in the year 1982. Tinkering with variations of High occupancy vehicle lanes occurred in the 1980s, and in 1999 Virginia Governor Gilmore announced a plan to widen both directions of I-66 within the Beltway. Soon thereafter a new organization, Arlington Coalition for Sensible Transportation, was formed to oppose further widening of I-66. This successor group to ACT questions the break in precedent from the intent of the "Coleman Decision", the lack of integrated transportation planning in the corridor, and further environmental impacts to Arlington.

== Bibliography ==
- Bill Peterson, "For the Govans, the Road to Victory Is Unpaved". The Washington Post, August 21, 1975
- C. Michael Hogan and Harry Seidman, Air Quality and Acoustics Analysis of proposed I-66 through Arlington, Virginia, ESL Inc. Technical Document T1026, Sunnyvale, Calif. (1971)
- Jim and Emilia Govan, Oral Histories, Arlington County Library
- Mirriam A. Rollin, President of Arlington Coalition for Sensible Transportation, Comments at the Richmond Hearing at the Commonwealth Transportation Board of Virginia October 5, 2000
- Virginia Highway Commission, Design Plans for Interstate 66, (1970)
- Stephen J. Lyntona, "Long Road: Bitter Fight Against I-66 Now History I-66's Final Shape A Tribute To Its Opponents' Tenacity", The Washington Post, December 22, 1982
- Jack Eisen, "Citizen Groups Attack Plans for Freeway", The Washington Post, September 7, 1972
