= Tramlining =

Vehicle tires following surface contours

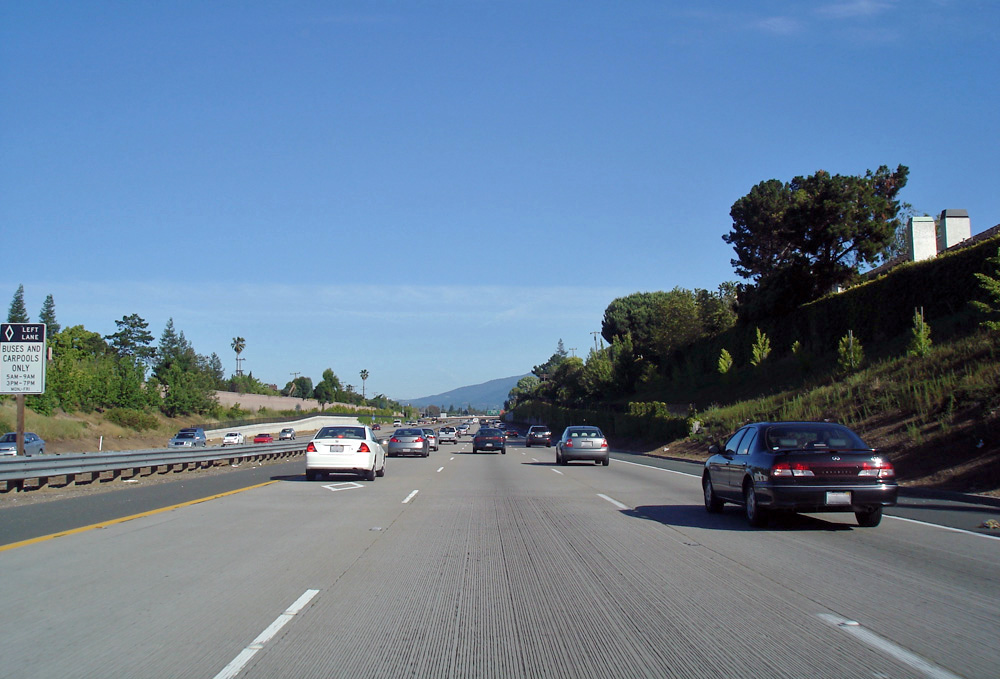
Rain grooved road that can cause tramlining

Tramlining is the tendency of a vehicle's wheels to follow the contours in the surface upon which it runs. The term comes from the tendency of a car's wheels to follow the normally recessed rails of street trams, without driver input in the same way that the train does. The same effect is sometimes called nibbling.

Tramlining can usually be blamed on tires, and its incidence depends greatly on the type of the tire and its state of wear. Although not normally dangerous, at very high speeds it can become a source of instability.

Vehicles with large and wide low-profile tires are more prone to the effects as well as vehicles which have wheels fitted that are larger than the manufacturer's recommendation or have reinforced sidewalls. People who are relatively inexperienced with driving with this tendency will feel that they have to make continual course corrections and it is very easy to overcompensate the steering, which could potentially lead to veering off the road especially if the road is a narrow track/country road.

The effects of tramlining can be eased by subjecting the vehicle to an inspection and calibration of the wheels (i.e. a full geometry check) or replacing the tires with non-reinforced (soft-sidewall) tires.

== See also ==
- Groove wander
