= Controlled traffic farming =

Agricultural management tool

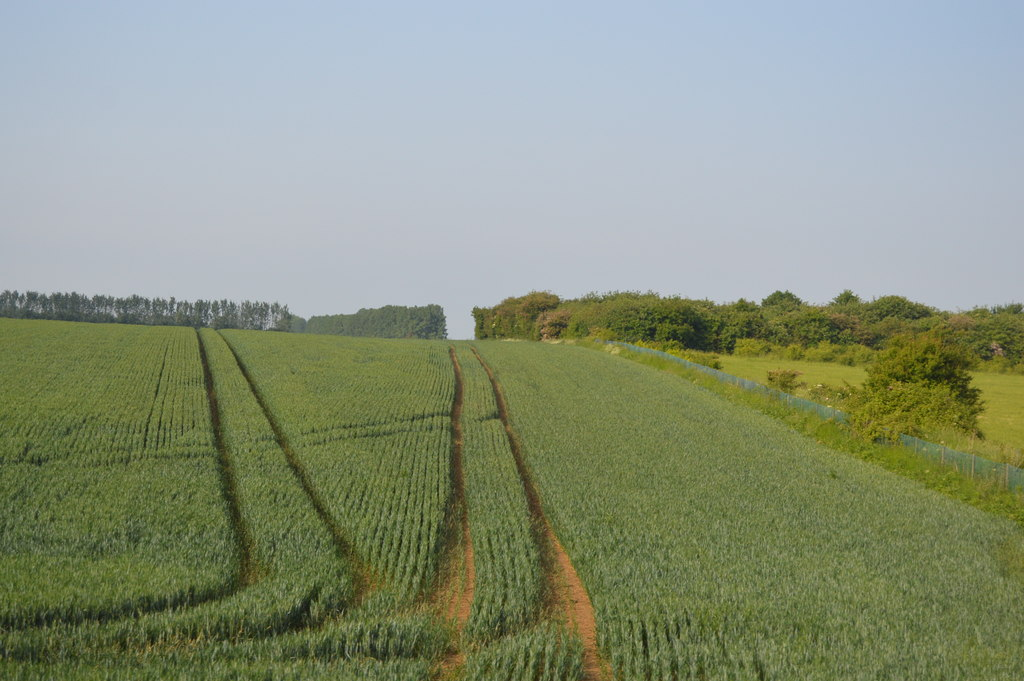
Tramlines in a field

Controlled traffic farming (CTF) is a management tool which is used to reduce the damage to soils caused by heavy or repeated agricultural machinery passes on the land. This damage and its negative consequences have been well documented and include increased fuel use, poor seedbeds, reduced crop yields and poor soil function in terms of water infiltration, drainage and greenhouse gas mitigation due to soil compaction.

Controlled traffic farming is a system which confines all machinery loads to the least possible area of permanent traffic lanes. Current farming systems allow machines to run at random over the land, compacting around 75% of the area within one season and the whole area by the second season. Soils don't recover quickly, taking as much as a few years (e.g., >5 years, particularly in soils without swelling-shrinking properties). A proper CTF system on the other hand can reduce tracking to just 15% and this is always in the same place. CTF is a tool; it does not include a prescription for tillage although most growers adopting CTF use little or none because soil structure does not need to be repaired. The permanent traffic lanes are normally parallel to each other and this is the most efficient way of achieving CTF, but the definition does not preclude tracking at an angle. The permanent traffic lanes may be cropped or non-cropped depending on a wide range of variables and local constraints.

== Achieving controlled traffic farming ==
Controlled traffic farming can be achieved on any scale but to get tracked areas to the minimum possible, there are three requirements:

- To match implement widths so that adjacent passes are in the same place for all machines working in the field.
- To match the track widths (the distance between wheel centres on the same axle) of all field machinery.
- To keep machines in exactly the same place year in year out.

Matching implement widths is a case of forward planning, or making sure that if anything doesn't match now, its replacement will. It's also the case that the wider the implements are, the less will be the tracked area. Growers often find they can use wider machines because without soil damage, they are easier to pull and in the case of cultivators, most likely don't need to work anywhere near as deep.

Matching track widths is more difficult because grain harvesters often come with a track of 3 m or more and matching to these would make all machines very wide and often impractical to use on a daily basis. Matching to the harvester track works well in Australia where properties are often remote, there is plenty of space and road travel may not be too extensive. In other parts to the world, including most of Europe, alternatives have been found. These may not be quite as efficient in minimising the tracked area, but achieving less than 20% is still perfectly feasible.

In controlled traffic farming systems for vegetable cropping, track widths vary between 1.83 m (the 72” imperial standard) to customised systems of perhaps 3.2 m or more. Road transport with these wide systems can be difficult but their use in the Netherlands and Denmark is increasing and growers accept the constraints because of the advantages that the systems bring.

Keeping machines in exactly the same place is most easily achieved with a satellite guidance system based on an RTK correction signal and auto-steer. Only the RTK system can guarantee to keep vehicles in the same place year in year out and it also achieves the highest pass to pass accuracy of around ± 2 cm. Guidance systems have many other advantages and once a system of this nature has been adopted, the natural progression is to move to controlled traffic farming.

The generic advantages of guidance include much reduced overlap between passes of machines, particularly of wide cultivators which may overlap by around 10%. Although planters and drills use physical markers to match up between one pass and the next, cumulative errors can be large and non-cropped tracks created by these machines (tramlines) for chemical applications can often have an overlap of 5%. The implications of this are significant because tramlines are used for all chemical applications. A 5% overlap wastes the equivalent in increasingly expensive materials and through overdosing, damages crops and could lead to extra run-off and diffuse pollution.

== Advantages ==
The main advantages are:

- improved crop yields, particularly in seasons with extreme dry or wet
- lower inputs for crop establishment, which:
  - reduce fuel use
  - reduce power demand meaning smaller tractors to do the same job
  - improve timeliness of operations
- better soil health and function, which:
  - improves soil porosity meaning there is more space for water and air;
  - improves water infiltration which reduces the potential for soil erosion and increases water availability to the crop;
  - improves drainage which avoids waterlogging and the potential for nitrous oxide and methane emissions and methane oxidation.
  - improves crop rooting and the efficiency of nutrient uptake, leading to less waste and potential for environmental pollution.
- improves field access, particularly when soil moisture is high. Field operations are often needed in less than ideal conditions and when carried out, can cause extensive damage. Controlled traffic farming provides a firmer base for these operations (the permanent tracks) and constrains the damage to narrow strips.

== Disadvantages ==
More discipline is required in the field, and can increase journey times when removing large volumes of material, such as sugar beet or potatoes.

The initial investment in technology and infrastructure for a CTF can be high.

The implementation of CTF requires special equipment such as GPS control, precision farming technology and machines adapted to work on transport routes.

The transition to CTF may require a change in habits and working practices for farmers and workers. Education and training focused on new methods and technologies are key to successful implementation.

== Future ==
Although controlled traffic farming is still in its infancy as far as adoption is concerned (partially because the enabling technology of satellite guidance is still relatively new), there is a better engineering solution that would reduce tracked areas to less than 10%. This is not a recent concept, having been pioneered by Alexander Halkett in the 1850s and David Dowler in the 1970s, but the concept of a wide span vehicle is becoming increasingly attractive because of the other advantages it brings.

The concept is described in detail at controlled traffic farming Europe's wide span page and achieves the low tracked area by virtue of using one of the same wheel tracks on adjacent passes. The system also reduces reliance on satellite technology because a guiding wheel track for the next pass is automatically laid down. With implements mostly contained within its wheel track, part width operations, for example ploughing or root crop harvesting, are perfectly feasible, whereas with existing tractor systems they are not.
