= Noise pollution =

Excessive displeasing noise

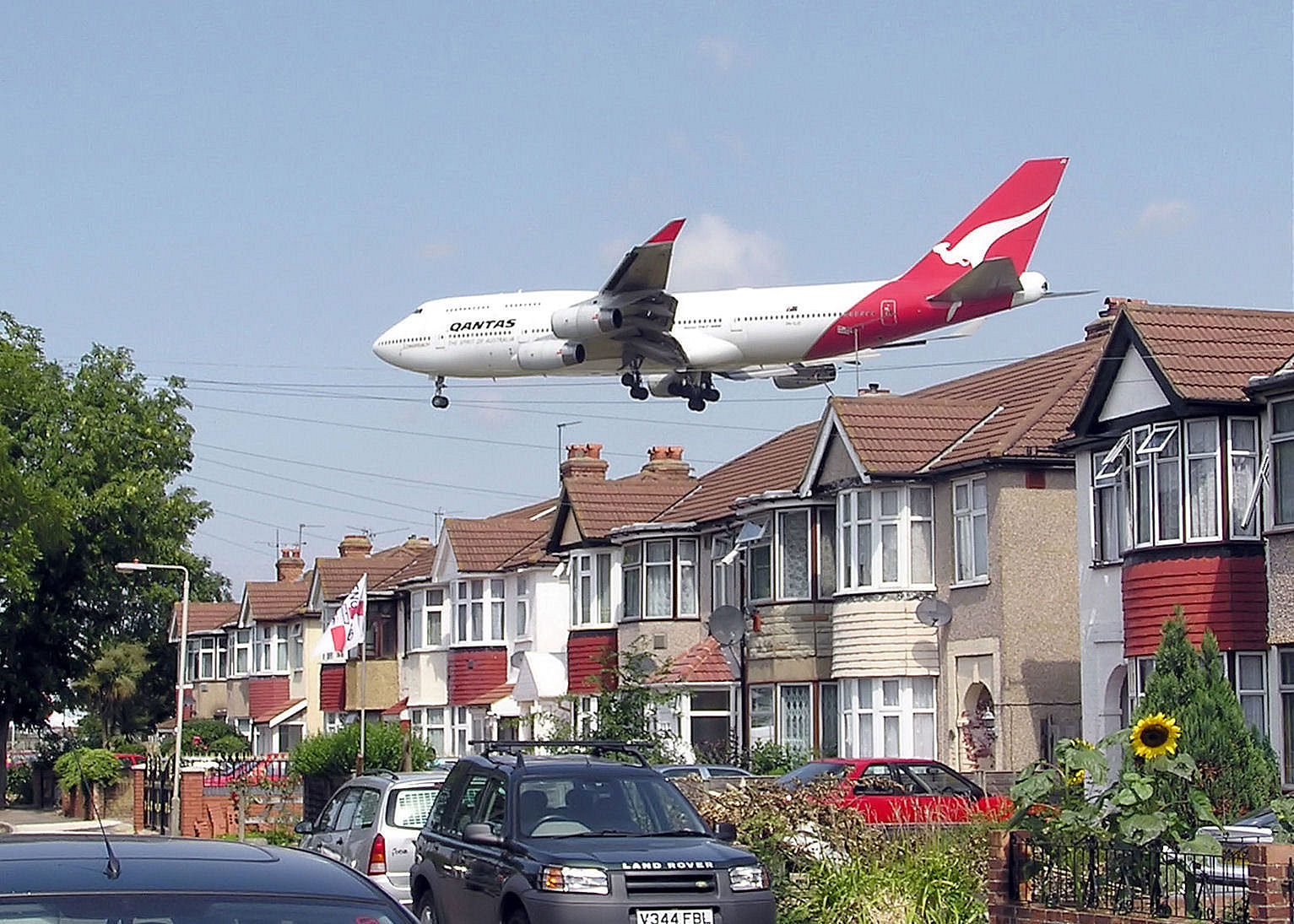
A Qantas Boeing 747-400 passes close to houses shortly before landing at London Heathrow Airport.

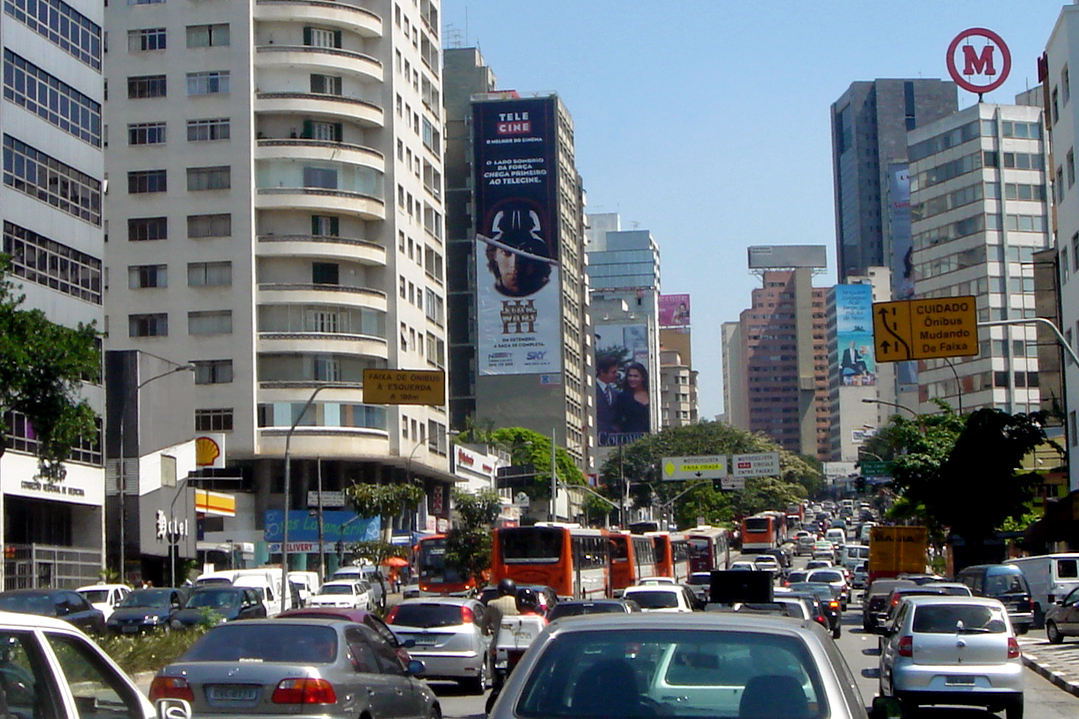
Traffic is the main source of noise pollution in cities like São Paulo.

Noise pollution is sound with potential harmful effects on humans and animals. The main sources of outdoor noise worldwide are machines, transportation, and propagation systems. Poor urban planning may give rise to noise pollution. Side-by-side industrial and residential zones can result in noise pollution in residential areas. Some of the main sources of noise in residential areas include loud music, transportation (traffic, rail, airplanes, etc.), lawn care maintenance, construction, electrical generators, wind turbines, explosions, and other human activity.

Documented problems associated with noise in urban environments go back as far as ancient Rome. Research suggests that noise pollution in the United States is the highest in low-income and racial minority neighborhoods, and noise pollution associated with household electricity generators is an emerging environmental degradation in many developing nations. A national study of modeled transportation noise in the contiguous United States found that census tracts with higher proportions of Black, Hispanic, and Asian population and higher poverty had higher average noise levels than wealthier and mostly White areas. The study found that residential segregation and urban land use practices correlate with the high levels of traffic and aviation noise in many communities of color and low-income neighborhoods.

High noise levels can contribute to cardiovascular effects in humans and an increased incidence of coronary artery disease. In animals, noise can increase the risk of death by altering predator or prey detection and avoidance, interfere with reproduction and navigation, and contribute to permanent hearing loss.

== Noise assessment ==
=== Metrics of noise ===
More than a quarter of US residences have average outside noise levels exceeding the maximum nighttime outside noise level recommended by the World Health Organization.

Noise exposure is quantified in terms of sound pressure levels measured in decibels (dB), a logarithmic scale used to relate physical sound intensity to human perception. Everyday environmental sounds such as road traffic and construction typically range from about 70 to over 100 dB, and repeated exposure above approximately 85 dB is associated with an increased risk of hearing damage. Metrics such as the equivalent continuous sound level (L_eq) and the day–night average sound level (L_dn) are commonly used in regulatory and public health contexts to describe long-term community noise exposure.

Researchers measure noise in terms of pressure, intensity, and frequency. Sound pressure level (SPL) represents the amount of pressure relative to atmospheric pressure during sound wave propagation that can vary with time; this is also known as the sum of the amplitudes of a wave. Sound intensity, measured in Watts per meters-squared, represents the flow of sound over a particular area. Although sound pressure and intensity differ, both can describe the level of loudness by comparing the current state to the threshold of hearing; this results in decibel units on the logarithmic scale. The logarithmic scale accommodates the vast range of sound heard by the human ear.

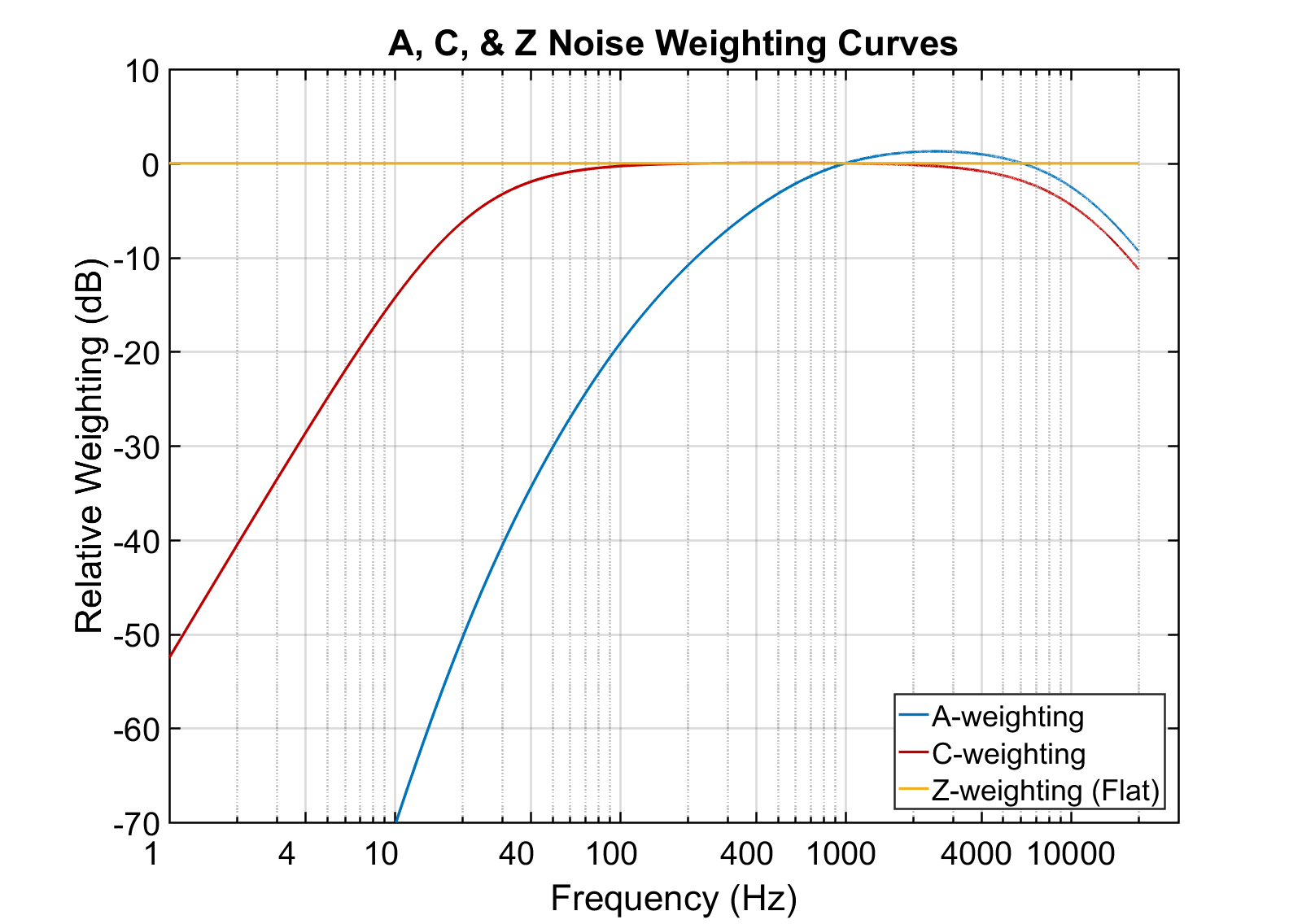
Depiction of frequency weighting

Frequency, or pitch, is measured in hertz (Hz) and reflects the number of sound waves propagated through the air per second. Humans generally hear frequencies from 20 Hz to 20,000 Hz; however, sensitivity to hearing higher frequencies decreases with age. Some organisms, such as elephants, can register frequencies between 0 and 20 Hz (infrasound), and others, such as bats, can recognize frequencies above 20,000 Hz (ultrasound) to echolocate.

Researchers use different weights to account for noise frequency with intensity, as humans do not perceive sound at the same loudness level. The most commonly used weighted levels are A-weighting, C-weighting, and Z-weighting. A-weighting mirrors the range of hearing, with frequencies of 20 Hz to 20,000 Hz. This gives more weight to higher frequencies and less weight to lower frequencies. C-weighting has been used to measure peak sound pressure or impulse noise, similar to loud short-lived noises from machinery in occupational settings. Z-weighting, also known as zero-weighting, represents noise levels without any frequency weights.

Understanding sound pressure levels is key to assessing measurements of noise pollution. Several metrics describing noise exposure include:

- Energy average equivalent level of the A-weighted sound, LAeq: This measures the average sound energy over a given period for constant or continuous noise, such as road traffic. LAeq can be further broken up into different types of noise based on time of day; however, cutoffs for evening and nighttime hours may differ between countries, with the United States, Belgium, and New Zealand noting evening hours from 19:00–22:00 or 7:00 p.m.–10:00 p.m. and nighttime hours from 22:00–7:00 or 10:00 p.m.–7:00 a.m. and most European countries noting evening hours from 19:00–23:00 or 7:00 p.m.–11:00 p.m. and nighttime hours from 23:00–7:00 or 11:00 p.m.–7:00 a.m.). LAeq terms include:
  - Day-night average level, DNL or LDN: This measurement assesses the cumulative exposure to sound for a 24-hour period (L_{eq} over 24 hrs) of the year, with a 10 dB(A) penalty or weight added to nighttime noise measurements given the increased sensitivity to noise at night. This is calculated from the following equation (United States, Belgium, New Zealand): $L_{dn}=10\cdot\log_{10}\frac{1}{24}\left(15\cdot10^\frac{L_{day}}{10}+9\cdot10^\frac{L_{night}+10}{10}\right)$
  - Day-evening-night average level, DENL or Lden: This measurement, commonly used in European countries, assesses the 24-hour average in a year (similar to DNL); however, this measurement separates evening (4 hours, 19:00–23:00 or 7:00pm–11:00pm) from night hours (8 hours, 23:00–7:00 or 11:00 p.m.–7:00 a.m.) and adds a 5 dB penalty to evening and 10 dB penalty to nighttime hours. This is calculated from the following equation (most of Europe): $L_{den}=10\cdot\log_{10}\frac{1}{24}\left (12\cdot10^\frac{L_{day}}{10}+4\cdot10^\frac{L_{evening}+5}{10}+8\cdot10^\frac{L_{night}+10}{10}\right)$
  - Daytime level, LAeqD, or Lday: This measurement assesses daytime noise, usually from 7:00–19:00 (7 a.m.–7 p.m.), yet may vary by country.
  - Nighttime level, LAeqN, or Lnight: This measurement assesses nighttime noise, depending on country cutoff hours discussed above.
- Maximum level, LAmax: This measurement represents the maximal noise level when examining point sources or single events of noise; however, this value does not factor in duration of the event.
- Sound exposure level of A-weighted sound, SEL: This measurement represents the total energy for a particular event. SEL is used to describe discrete events in terms of A-weighted sound. The difference between SEL and LAmax is that SEL is derived using multiple time points of a particular event in calculating sound levels rather than the peak value.
- Percentile-derived measurements (L10, L50, L90, etc.): Noise may be described in terms of its statistical distribution over a set time, in which investigators may obtain values, or cut-points, at any percentile level. The L90 is the sound level that exceeds 90% of the time period; this is commonly referred to as background noise.

Researchers with the US National Park Service found that human activity doubles the background-noise levels in 63 percent of protected spaces like national parks, and increases them tenfold in 21 percent. In the latter places, "if you could have heard something 100 feet away, now you can only hear it 10 feet away".

=== Instrumentation ===
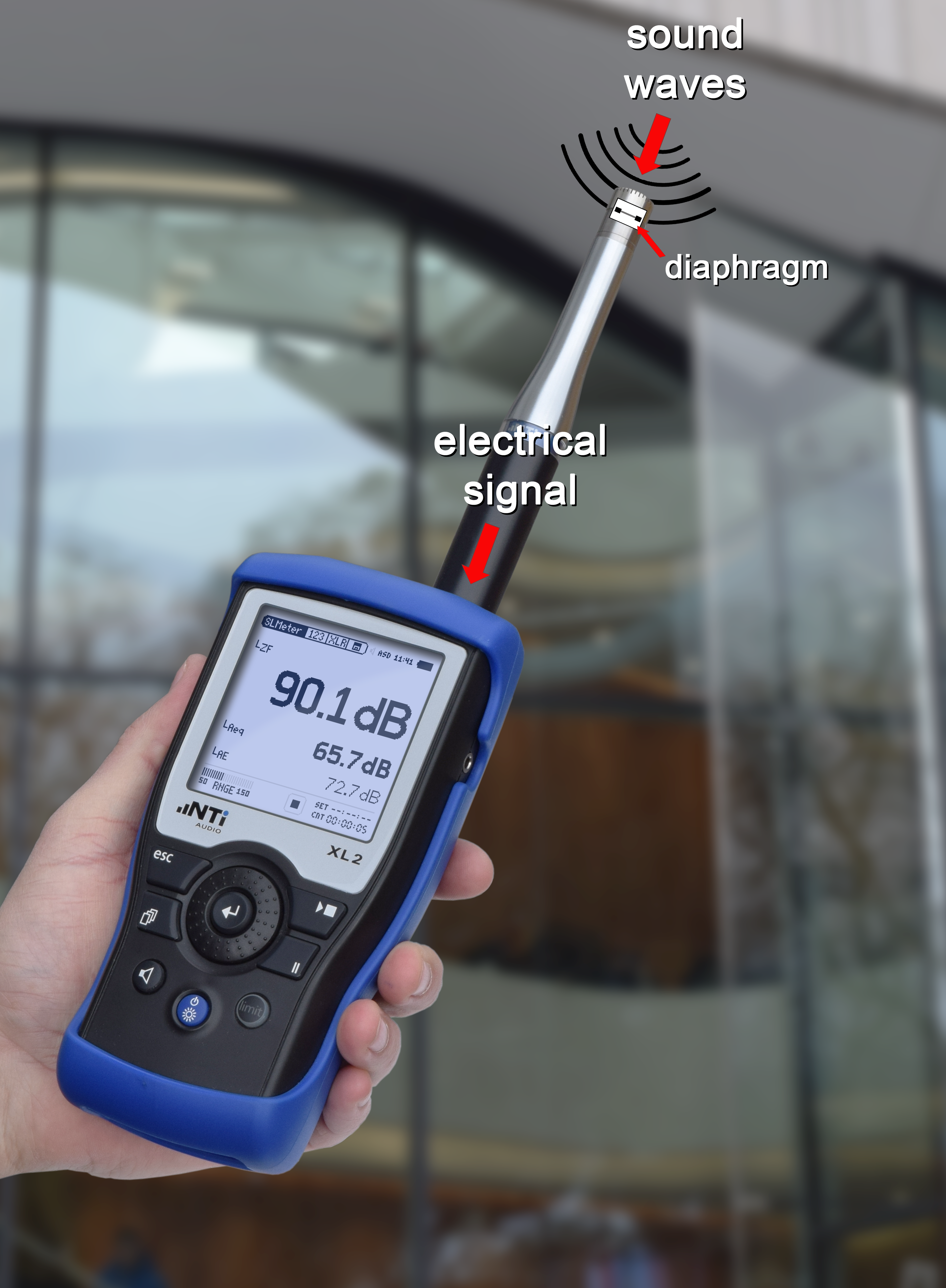
A sound level meter is one of the main tools for measuring sounds in the environment and the workplace.

==== Sound level meters ====
Sound can be measured in the air using a sound level meter, a device consisting of a microphone, an amplifier, and a time meter. Sound level meters can measure noise at different frequencies (usually A- and C-weighted levels). There are two settings for response time constants, fast (time constant = 0.125 seconds, similar to human hearing) or slow (1 second, used for calculating averages over widely varying sound levels). Sound level meters meet the required standards set by the International Electrotechnical Commission (IEC) and in the United States, the American National Standards Institute as type 0, 1, or 2 instruments.

Type 0 devices are not required to meet the same criteria expected of types 1 and 2 since scientists use these as laboratory reference standards. Type 1 (precision) instruments are to study the precision of capturing sound measurements, while type 2 instruments are for general field use. Type 1 devices acceptable by the standards have a margin of error of ±1.5 dB, while type 2 instruments meet a margin of error of ±2.3 dB.

==== Dosimeters ====
Sound can also be measured using a noise dosimeter, a device similar to a sound level meter. Individuals have used dosimeters to measure personal exposure levels in occupational settings given their smaller, more portable size. Unlike many sound level meters, a dosimeter microphone attaches to the worker and monitors levels throughout a work shift. Additionally, dosimeters can calculate the percent dose or time-weighted average (TWA).

==== Smartphone applications ====
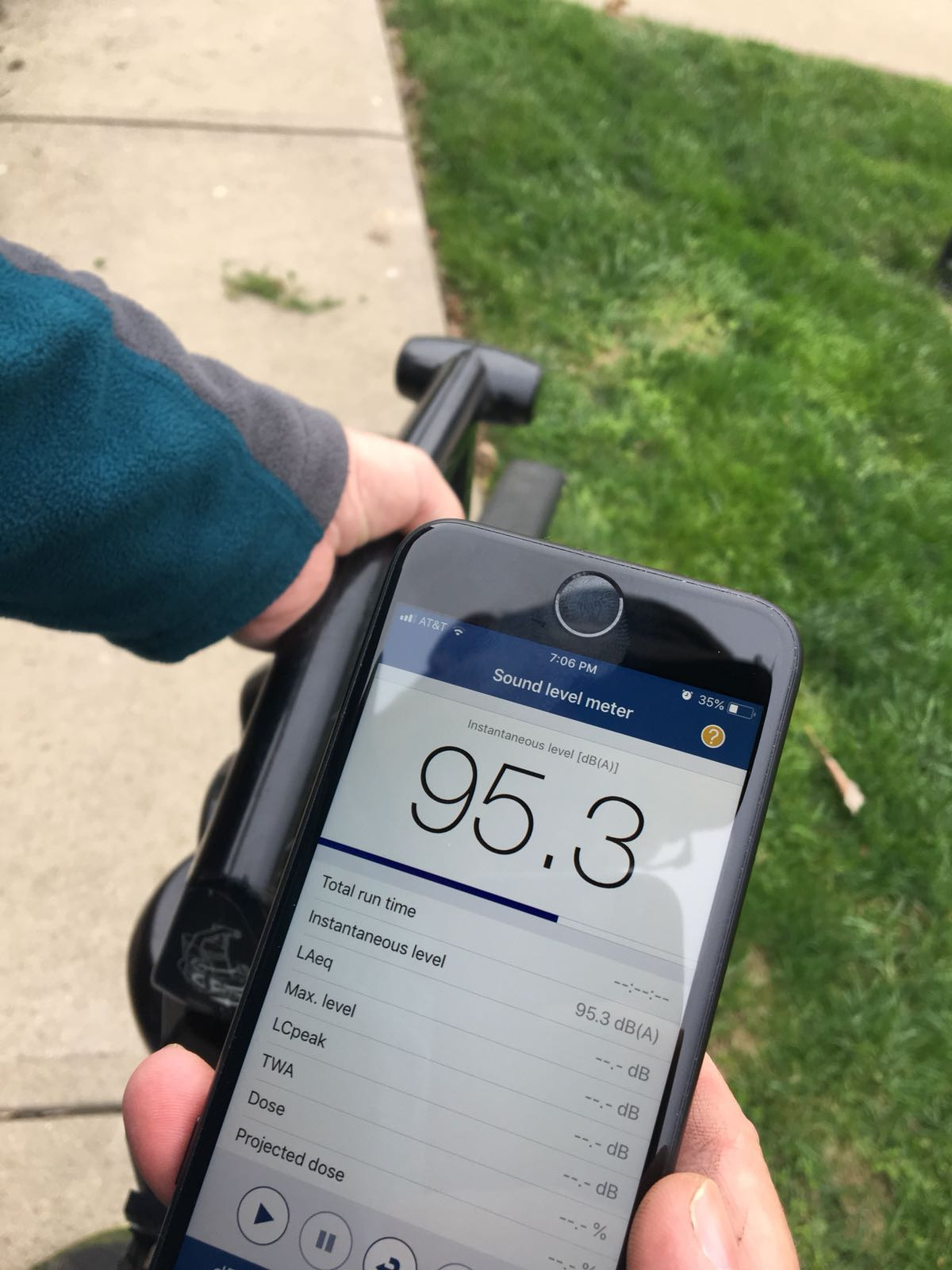
Measuring the noise level from a leaf blower using the NIOSH Sound Level Meter app

In recent years, scientists and audio engineers have been developing smartphone apps to conduct sound measurements, similar to the standalone sound level meters and dosimeters. In 2014, the National Institute for Occupational Safety and Health (NIOSH) within the Centers for Disease Control and Prevention (CDC) published a study examining the efficacy of 192 sound measurement apps on iOS and Android smartphones.

The authors found that only 10 apps, all of which were on the App Store, met all acceptability criteria. Of these 10 apps, only 4 apps met accuracy criteria within 2 dB(A) from the reference standard. As a result of this study, they created the NIOSH Sound Level Meter App to increase accessibility and decrease costs of monitoring noise using crowdsourcing data with a tested and highly accurate application. The app is compliant with ANSI S1.4 and IEC 61672 requirements.

The app calculates the following measures: total run time, instantaneous sound level, A-weighted equivalent sound level (LAeq), maximum level (LAmax), C-weighted peak sound level, time-weighted average (TWA), dose, and projected dose. Dose and projected dose are based on sound level and duration of noise exposure in relation to the NIOSH recommended exposure limit of 85 dB(A) for an eight-hour work shift.

Using the phone's internal microphone (or an attached external microphone), the NIOSH Sound Level Meter measures instantaneous sound levels in real time and converts sound into electrical energy to calculate measurements in A-, C-, or Z-weighted decibels. App users are able to generate, save, and e-mail measurement reports. The NIOSH Sound Level Meter is currently only available on Apple iOS devices.

== Impacts ==
=== Human health ===
Noise pollution affects both health and behavior. Unwanted sound (noise) can damage physiological and mental health. Noise pollution is associated with several health conditions, including cardiovascular disorders, hypertension, high stress levels, tinnitus, hearing loss, sleep disturbances, and other harmful effects. In addition to hearing damage, chronic exposure to environmental noise is linked to broader health effects including cardiovascular disease, hypertension, sleep disturbance, stress, anxiety, and reduced cognitive performance. Research indicates that prolonged noise exposure can activate the body’s stress response, elevate stress hormones, and contribute to increased risk of heart attacks, strokes, and metabolic disorders such as diabetes, particularly in populations exposed to high traffic noise levels. According to a research article, exposure to sound levels exceeding 81 dB was associated with a higher prevalence of prehypertension and hypertension in a local population in Pakistan. According to a 2019 review of the existing literature, noise pollution was associated with faster cognitive decline.

According to the European Environment Agency, an estimated 113 million people across Europe are affected by road traffic noise levels above 55 decibels, the threshold at which noise becomes harmful to human health by the WHO's definition.

Sound becomes unwanted when it either interferes with normal activities such as sleep or conversation, or disrupts or diminishes one's quality of life. Noise-induced hearing loss can be caused by prolonged exposure to noise levels above 85 A-weighted decibels. A comparison of Maaban tribesmen, who were insignificantly exposed to transportation or industrial noise, to a typical U.S. population showed that chronic exposure to moderately high levels of environmental noise contributes to hearing loss.

Noise exposure in the workplace can also contribute to noise-induced hearing loss and other health issues. Occupational hearing loss is one of the most common work-related illnesses in the U.S. and worldwide.

It is less clear how humans adapt to noise subjectively. Tolerance for noise is frequently independent of decibel levels. Murray Schafer's soundscape research was groundbreaking in this regard. In his work, he makes compelling arguments about how humans relate to noise on a subjective level, and how such subjectivity is conditioned by culture. Schafer notes that sound is an expression of power in material culture. As such, fast cars or Harley Davidson motorcycles with aftermarket pipes tend to have louder engines not only for safety reasons, but for the expression of power by dominating the soundscape with a particular sound.

Other key research in this area can be seen in Fong's comparative analysis of soundscape differences between Bangkok, Thailand, and Los Angeles, California, US. Based on Schafer's research, Fong's study showed how soundscapes differ based on the level of urban development in the area. He found that cities in the periphery have different soundscapes than inner city areas. Fong's findings tie soundscape appreciation to subjective views of sound and demonstrate how different sounds of the soundscape are indicative of class differences in urban environments.

Noise pollution can have negative effects on adults and children on the autism spectrum. Those with Autism Spectrum Disorder (ASD) can have hyperacusis, which is an abnormal sensitivity to sound. People with ASD who experience hyperacusis may have unpleasant emotions, such as fear and anxiety, and uncomfortable physical sensations in noisy environments with loud sounds. This can cause individuals with ASD to avoid environments with noise pollution, which in turn can result in isolation and negatively affect their quality of life. Sudden explosive noises typical of high-performance car exhausts and car alarms are types of noise pollution that can affect people with ASD. In line with recent analysis, transportation noise is an environmental cardiovascular risk factor, with long-term exposure to road, rail, and airplane noise associated with increased risk of ischemic heart disease, stroke, heart failure, hypertension, and diabetes. An updated thorough review of noise and human cognition defines environmental noise exposure as a major global public health concern, arguing that tighter government controls are required to reduce its impact on learning, attention, and cognitive performance. Broader assessments of noise pollution state that these cardiovascular and cognitive impacts demonstrate why governments require enforceable noise limitations and active monitoring to minimize long-term harm to human health and ecosystems.

While the elderly may have cardiac problems due to noise, according to the World Health Organization, children are especially vulnerable to noise, and the effects that noise has on children may be permanent. Noise poses a serious threat to a child's physical and psychological health, and may negatively interfere with a child's learning and behavior. Exposure to persistent noise pollution shows how important maintaining environmental health is in keeping children and elderly healthy.

=== Wildlife ===
Noise generated by traffic, ships, vehicles, and aircraft can affect the survivability of wildlife species and can reach undisturbed habitats. Although sounds are commonly present in the environment, anthropogenic noises are distinguishable due to differences in frequency and amplitude. Many animals use sounds to communicate with others of their species, whether that is for reproduction purposes, navigation, or to notify others of prey or predators. However, anthropogenic noises inhibit species from detecting these sounds, affecting overall communication within the population. Noise pollution can interfere with animal behavior such as communication, foraging, reproduction, navigation, predator avoidance, and parental care. Marine species such as cetaceans (whales and dolphins) rely on sound for echolocation and are particularly vulnerable to ship noise and sonar, which has been associated with strandings and disorientation among individuals. Terrestrial wildlife, including birds and insects, may also experience disrupted breeding and increased stress responses under high ambient noise levels. Species such as birds, amphibians, reptiles, fishes, mammals, and invertebrates are examples of biological groups that are impacted by noise pollution. If animals cannot communicate with one another, reproduction may decline (due to inability to find mates) and mortality may increase (due to inability to warn of a predator). The study of these relationships between acoustic organisms, the acoustic environment, and resulting impacts is known as soundscape ecology or acoustic ecology.

European robins living in urban environments are more likely to sing at night in places with high levels of noise pollution during the day, suggesting that they sing at night because it is quieter, and their message can propagate through the environment more clearly. The same study showed that daytime noise was a stronger predictor of nocturnal singing than night-time light pollution, to which the phenomenon often is attributed. Anthropogenic noise reduced the species richness of birds found in Neotropical urban parks.

Zebra finches become less faithful to their partners when exposed to traffic noise. This could alter a population's evolutionary trajectory by selecting traits, sapping resources normally devoted to other activities and thus leading to profound genetic and evolutionary consequences.

According to a 2026 meta-analysis of 177 species across multiple continents found a 37% lower abundance as a result of noise pollution.

==== Why invertebrates are affected ====
Several reasons have been identified relating to hypersensitivity in invertebrates when exposed to anthropogenic noise. Invertebrates have evolved to pick up sound, and a large portion of their physiology is adapted for the purpose of detecting environmental vibrations. Antennae or hairs on the organism pick up particle motion. Anthropogenic noise created in the marine environment, such as pile driving and shipping, are picked up through particle motion; these activities exemplify near-field stimuli.

The ability to detect vibration through mechanosensory structures is most important in invertebrates and fish. Mammals, also, depend on pressure detector ears to perceive the noise around them. Therefore, it is suggested that marine invertebrates are likely perceiving the effects of noise differently than marine mammals. It is reported that invertebrates can detect a large range of sounds, but noise sensitivity varies substantially between each species. Generally, however, invertebrates depend on frequencies under 10 kHz. This is the frequency at which a great deal of ocean noise occurs.

Therefore, not only does anthropogenic noise often mask invertebrate communication, but it also negatively impacts other biological system functions through noise-induced stress. Another one of the leading causes of noise effects in invertebrates is because sound is used in multiple behavioral contexts by many groups. This includes regularly sound produced or perceived in the context of aggression or predator avoidance. Invertebrates also utilize sound to attract or locate mates, and often employ sound in the courtship process.

==== Stress recorded in physiological and behavioral responses ====
Sound from machines used for the care of greenery, recorded in the vicinity of a four-story apartment complex in Tomaszów Mazowiecki, Poland

Many of the studies that were conducted on invertebrate exposure to noise found that a physiological or behavioral response was triggered. Most of the time, this related to stress, and provided concrete evidence that marine invertebrates detect and respond to noise. Some of the most informative studies in this category focus on hermit crabs. In one study, it was found that the behavior of the hermit crab Pagurus bernhardus, when attempting to choose a shell, was modified when subjected to noise.

Proper selection of hermit crab shells strongly contributes to their ability to survive. Shells offer protection against predators, high salinity and desiccation. However, researchers determined that approach to shell, investigation of shell, and habitation of shell, occurred over a shorter time duration with anthropogenic noise as a factor. This indicated that assessment and decision-making processes of the hermit crab were both altered, even though hermit crabs are not known to evaluate shells using any auditory or mechanoreception mechanisms.

In another study that focused on Pagurus bernhardus and the blue mussel (Mytilus edulis), physical behaviors exhibited a stress response to noise. When the hermit crab and mussel were exposed to different types of noise, significant variation in the valve gape occurred in the blue mussel. The hermit crab responded to the noise by lifting the shell off of the ground multiple times, then vacating the shell to examine it before returning inside. The results from the hermit crab trials were ambiguous with respect to causation; more studies must be conducted in order to determine whether the behavior of the hermit crab can be attributed to the noise produced.

Another study that demonstrates a stress response in invertebrates was conducted on the longfin inshore squid (Doryteuthis pealeii). The squid was exposed to sounds of construction known as pile driving, which impacts the sea bed directly and produces intense substrate-borne and water-borne vibrations. The squid reacted by jetting, inking, pattern change and other startle responses. Since the responses recorded are similar to those identified when faced with a predator, it is implied that the squid initially viewed the sounds as a threat. However, it was also noted that the alarm responses decreased over a period of time, signifying that the squid had likely acclimated to the noise. Regardless, it is apparent that stress occurred in the squid, and although further investigation has not been pursued, researchers suspect that other implications exist that may alter the squid's survival habits.

An additional study examined the impact noise exposure had on the Indo-Pacific humpback dolphin (Sousa chinensis). The dolphins were exposed to elevated noise levels due to construction in the Pearl River Estuary in China, specifically caused by the world's largest vibration hammer—the OCTA-KONG. The study suggested that while the dolphin's clicks were not affected, their whistles were because of susceptibility to auditory masking. The noise from the OCTA-KONG was found to have been detectable by the dolphins up to 3.5 km away from the original source, and while the noise was not found to be life-threatening it was indicated that prolonged exposure to this noise could be responsible for auditory damage.

=== Marine life ===
Noise pollution is common in marine ecosystems, affecting at least 55 marine species. For many marine populations, sound is the primary sense used for survival. These animals can detect sounds hundreds or even thousands of kilometers away, while vision is limited to tens of meters underwater. As anthropogenic noises continue to increase, doubling every decade, the survival of marine species may be increasingly threatened. One study discovered that as seismic noises and naval sonar increases in marine ecosystems, cetacean, such as whales and dolphins, diversity decreases. Noise pollution has also impaired fish hearing, killed and isolated whale populations, intensified stress response in marine species, and changed species' physiology. Because marine species are sensitive to noise, most marine wildlife are located in undisturbed habitats or areas not exposed to significant anthropogenic noise, limiting suitable habitats to forage and mate. Whales have changed their migration route to avoid anthropogenic noise, as well as altering their calls. Research on narwhals in the Canadian Arctic found that individuals significantly reduced their acoustic activity in the presence of ships, highlighting the potential for vessel noise to disrupt essential behaviors such as navigation, foraging, and communication.

For many marine organisms, sound is the primary means of learning about their environments. For example, many species of marine mammals and fish use sound as their primary means of navigating, communicating, and foraging. Anthropogenic noise can have a detrimental effect on animals, increasing the risk of death by changing the delicate balance in predator or prey detection and avoidance, and interfering with the use of the sounds in communication, especially in relation to reproduction, and in navigation and echolocation. These effects then may alter more interactions within a community through indirect ("domino") effects. Acoustic overexposure can lead to temporary or permanent loss of hearing.

Noise pollution may have caused the death of certain species of whales that beached themselves after being exposed to the loud sound of military sonar. (see also Marine mammals and sonar) Up until recently, most research on noise impacts has been focused on marine mammals, and to a lesser degree, fish. In the past few years, scientists have shifted to conducting studies on invertebrates and their responses to anthropogenic sounds in the marine environment. This research is essential, especially considering that invertebrates make up 75% of marine species, and thus compose a large percentage of ocean food webs. Of the studies that have been conducted, a sizable variety in families of invertebrates have been represented in the research. A variation in the complexity of their sensory systems exists, which allows scientists to study a range of characteristics and develop a better understanding of anthropogenic noise impacts on living organisms.

Even marine invertebrates, such as crabs (Carcinus maenas), have been shown to be negatively affected by ship noise. Larger crabs were noted to be negatively affected more by the sounds than smaller crabs. Repeated exposure to the sounds did lead to acclimatization.

Underwater noise pollution due to human activities is also prevalent in the sea, and given that sound travels faster through water than through air, is a major source of disruption of marine ecosystems and does significant harm to sea life, including marine mammals, fish, and invertebrates. The once-calm sea environment is now noisy and chaotic due to ships, oil drilling, sonar equipment, and seismic testing. The principal anthropogenic noise sources come from merchant ships, naval sonar operations, underwater explosions (nuclear), and seismic exploration by oil and gas industries.

Cargo ships generate high levels of noise due to propellers and diesel engines. This noise pollution significantly raises the low-frequency ambient noise levels above those caused by wind. Animals such as whales that depend on sound for communication can be affected by this noise in various ways. Higher ambient noise levels also cause animals to vocalize more loudly, which is called the Lombard effect. Researchers have found that humpback whales' song lengths were longer when low-frequency sonar was active nearby.

==== Coral reefs ====
Noise pollution has emerged as a prominent stressor on coral reef ecosystems. Coral reefs are among the most important ecosystems on Earth, and are of great importance to several communities and cultures around the world, that depend on the reefs for the services they provide, such as fishing and tourism. The reefs contribute substantially to global biodiversity and productivity, and is a critical part of the support systems of the earth. Anthropogenic noise, originating from human activities, has increased underwater noise in the natural sound environment of the reefs. The preeminent sources of noise pollution on coral reefs are boat and ship activities. The sound created by the crossing of boats and ships overlaps with the natural sounds of the coral reef organisms. This pollution impacts the various organisms inhabiting the coral reefs in different ways, and ultimately damages the capabilities of the reef and may cause permanent deterioration.

Healthy coral reefs are naturally noisy, consisting of the sounds of breaking waves and tumbling rocks, as well as the sounds produced by fish and other organisms. Coral reef fish larvae use natural sounds produced by fish and other reef organisms to locate suitable habitats during settlement. However, underwater noise from boats can interfere with these acoustic signals and affect their orientation. A study found that fish larvae were less likely to move towards reef sounds when boat noise was present, suggesting that human activities can disrupt settlement behaviour and potentially affect reef fish populations. Marine organisms use sound for purposes such as navigating, foraging, communicating, and reproductive activities. The sensitivity and range of hearing varies across different organisms within the coral reef ecosystem. Among coral reef fish, sound detection and generation can span from 1 Hz to 200 kHz, while their hearing abilities encompasses frequencies within the range of 100 Hz to 1 kHz. Several different types of anthropogenic noise are at the same frequencies as marine organisms in coral reefs use for navigation, communication, and other purposes, which disturbs the natural sound environment of the coral reefs.

Anthropogenic sources of noise are generated by a range of different human activities, such as shipping, oil and gas exploration and fishing. The principal cause of noise pollution on coral reefs is boat and ship activities. The use of smaller motorboats, for purposes as fishing or tourism within coral reef areas, and larger vessels, such as cargo ships transporting goods, significantly amplifies disturbances to the natural marine soundscape. Noise from shipping and small boats is at the same frequency as sounds generated by marine organisms, and therefore acts as a disruptive element in the sound environment of coral reefs. Both longer-term and acute effects have been documented on coral reefs organisms after exposure to noise pollution.

Anthropogenic noise is essentially a persistent stressor on coral reefs and its inhabitants. Both temporary and permanent noise pollution has been found to induce changes in the distributional, physiological, and behavioral patterns of coral reef organisms. Some of the observed changes has been compromised hearing, increased heart rate in coral fish and a reduction in the number of larvae reaching their settlement areas. Ultimately, the outcome of such changes results in reduced survival rates and altered patterns which potentially alters the entirety of the reef ecosystem.

The white damselfish, a coral reef fish, has been found to have a compromised anti-predator behavior as a result to ship noise. The distraction of anthropogenic noise is possibly distracting the fish, and thereby affecting the escape response and routine swimming of the coral fish. A study conducted on species of coral larvae, which are crucial for the expansion of coral reefs, discovered that the larvae oriented towards the sound of healthy reefs. The noise created by anthropogenic activities could mask this soundscape, hindering the larvae from swimming towards the reef. Noise pollution ultimately poses a threat to the behavioral patterns of several coral organisms.

=== Noise pollution in freshwater environments ===
Underwater noise pollution can occur in freshwater environments. A study conducted on noise pollution in the Yangtze River suggested that noise pollution temporarily altered the hearing threshold of the finless porpoises and posed a significant threat to the survival of Yangtze finless porpoises.

=== Impacts on communication ===
Terrestrial anthropogenic noise affects the acoustic communications in grasshoppers while producing sound to attract a mate. The fitness and reproductive success of a grasshopper is dependent on its ability to attract a mating partner. Male Corthippus biguttulus grasshoppers attract females by using stridulation to produce courtship songs. The females produce acoustic signals that are shorter and primarily low frequency and amplitude, in response to the male's song. Research has found that this species of grasshopper changes its mating call in response to loud traffic noise. Lampe and Schmoll (2012) found that male grasshoppers from quiet habitats have a local frequency maximum of about 7319 Hz.

In contrast, male grasshoppers exposed to loud traffic noise can create signals with a higher local frequency maximum of 7622 Hz. The higher frequencies are produced by the grasshoppers to prevent background noise from drowning out their signals. This information reveals that anthropogenic noise disturbs the acoustic signals produced by insects for communication. Similar processes of behavior perturbation, behavioral plasticity, and population level shifts in response to noise likely occur in sound-producing marine invertebrates, but more experimental research is needed.

=== Impacts on development ===
Boat-noise has been shown to affect the embryonic development and fitness of the sea hare Stylocheilus striatus. Anthropogenic noise can alter conditions in the environment that have a negative effect on invertebrate survival. Although embryos can adapt to normal changes in their environment, evidence suggests they are not well adapted to endure the negative effects of noise pollution. Studies have been conducted on the sea hare to determine the effects of boat noise on the early stages of life and the development of embryos. Researchers have studied sea hares from the lagoon of Moorea Island, French Polynesia. In the study, recordings of boat noise were made by using a hydrophone. In addition, recordings of ambient noise were made that did not contain boat noise. In contrast to ambient noise playbacks, mollusks exposed to boat noise playbacks had a 21% reduction in embryonic development. Additionally, newly hatched larvae experienced an increased mortality rate of 22% when exposed to boat noise playbacks.

=== Impacts on ecosystem ===
Anthropogenic noise can have negative effects on invertebrates that aid in controlling environmental processes that are crucial to the ecosystem. There are a variety of natural underwater sounds produced by waves in coastal and shelf habitats, and biotic communication signals that do not negatively impact the ecosystem. The changes in behavior of invertebrates vary depending on the type of anthropogenic noise and is similar to natural noisescapes.

Experiments have examined the behavior and physiology of the clam (Ruditapes philippinarum), the decapod (Nephrops norvegicus), and the brittlestar (Amphiura filiformis) that are affected by sounds resembling shipping and building noises. The three invertebrates in the experiment were exposed to continuous broadband noise and impulsive broadband noise. The anthropogenic noise impeded the bioirrigation and burying behavior of Nephrops norvegicus. In addition, the decapod exhibited a reduction in movement. Ruditapes philippinarum experienced stress which caused a reduction in surface relocation. The anthropogenic noise caused the clams to close their valves and relocate to an area above the sediment-water interface. This response inhibits the clam from mixing the top layer of the sediment profile and hinders suspension feeding. Sound causes Amphiura filiformis to experience changes in physiological processes which results in irregularity of bioturbation behavior.

These invertebrates play a significant role in transporting substances for benthic nutrient cycling. As a result, ecosystems are negatively impacted when species cannot perform natural behaviors in their environment. Locations with shipping lanes, dredging, or commercial harbors are known as continuous broadband sound. Pile-driving, and construction are sources that exhibit impulsive broadband noise. The different types of broadband noise have different effects on the varying species of invertebrates and how they behave in their environment.

Another study found that the valve closures in the Pacific oyster Magallana gigas was a behavioral response to varying degrees of acoustic amplitude levels and noise frequencies. Oysters perceive near-field sound vibrations by utilizing statocysts. In addition, they have superficial receptors that detect variations in water pressure. Sound pressure waves from shipping can be produced below 200 Hz. Pile driving generates noise between 20 and 1000 Hz. In addition, large explosions can create frequencies ranging from 10 to 200 Hz. M. gigas can detect these noise sources because their sensory system can detect sound in the 10 to < 1000 Hz range.

The anthropogenic noise produced by human activity has been shown to negatively impact oysters. Studies have revealed that wide and relaxed valves are indicative of healthy oysters. The oysters are stressed when they do not open their valves as frequently in response to environmental noise. This provides support that the oysters detect noise at low acoustic energy levels. While we generally understand that marine noise pollution influences charismatic megafauna like whales and dolphins, understanding how invertebrates like oysters perceive and respond to human generated sound can provide further insight about the effects of anthropogenic noise on the larger ecosystem. The aquatic ecosystems are known to use sound to navigate, find food, and protect themselves. In 2020, one of the worst mass stranding of whales occurred in Australia. Experts suggest that noise pollution plays a major role in the mass stranding of whales.

Noise pollution has also altered avian communities and diversity. Anthropogenic noises have a similar effect on bird population as seen in marine ecosystems, where noises reduce reproductive success; cannot detect predators due to interferences of anthropogenic noises, minimize nesting areas, increase stress response, and species abundances and richness declining. Certain avian species are more sensitive to noises compared to others, resulting in highly-sensitive birds migrating to less disturbed habitats. There has also been evidence of indirect positive effects of anthropogenic noises on avian populations. It was found that nesting bird predators, such as the western scrub-jay (Aphelocoma californica), were uncommon in noisy environments (western scrub-jay are sensitive to noise). Therefore, reproductive success for nesting prey communities was higher due to the lack of predators. Noise pollution can alter the distribution and abundance of prey species, which can then impact predator populations.

== Noise control ==
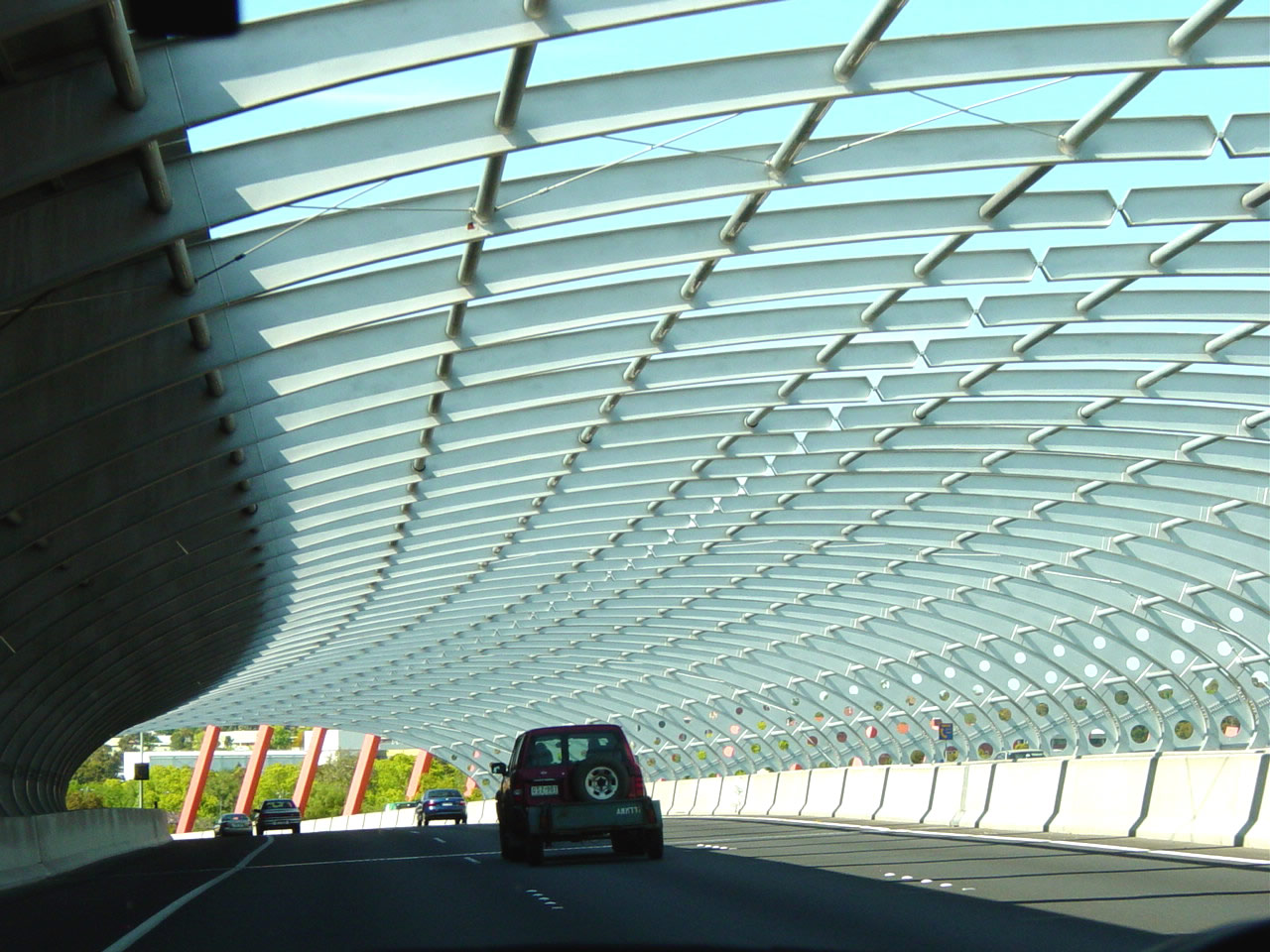
The CityLink sound tube in Flemington, Melbourne, Australia, is designed to reduce roadway noise without detracting from the area's aesthetics.

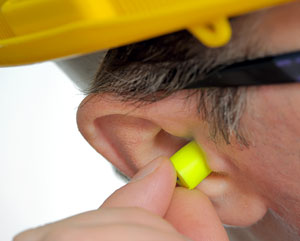
A man inserting an earplug in his ear to reduce noise exposure

Governments and communities implement noise regulations and mitigation strategies to reduce harmful exposure. Building codes and local ordinances may establish maximum allowable noise levels for residential, commercial, and industrial areas. Mitigation measures such as noise barriers, urban planning strategies, and standards for quieter machinery can help reduce ambient noise. In occupational settings, safety regulations limit both the intensity and duration of noise exposure to protect worker hearing, and personal protective equipment such as earmuffs or earplugs is commonly recommended in high-noise environments.

The Hierarchy of Controls concept is often used to reduce noise in the environment or the workplace. Engineering noise controls can be used to reduce noise propagation and protect individuals from overexposure. When noise controls are not feasible or adequate, individuals can also take steps to protect themselves from the harmful effects of noise pollution. If people must be around loud sounds, they can protect their ears with hearing protection (e.g., ear plugs or ear muffs).

Buy Quiet programs and initiatives have arisen in an effort to combat occupational noise exposures. These programs promote the purchase of quieter tools and equipment and encourage manufacturers to design quieter equipment.

Noise from roadways and other urban factors can be mitigated by urban planning and better design of roads. Roadway noise can be reduced by the use of noise barriers, limitation of vehicle speeds, alteration of roadway surface texture, limitation of heavy vehicles, use of traffic controls that smooth vehicle flow to reduce braking and acceleration, and tyre design.

An important factor in applying these strategies is a computer model for roadway noise, that is capable of addressing local topography, meteorology, traffic operations, and hypothetical mitigation. Costs of building-in mitigation can be modest, provided these solutions are sought in the planning stage of a roadway project. ISO 1996-1 and ISO 1996-2 are international standards that describe basic quantities, measuring methods, and assessment procedures for environmental noise. ISO 9613-2 is a widely used model for estimating outdoor sound propagation and creating noise maps. Based on these standards, Brazil's national norm NBR 10151 and Curitiba's Municipal Law 10 625 establishes maximum sound pressure levels that vary by land use and time of day, with stricter limits in residential zones and at night, as well as guidelines for measuring and interpreting community noise. In regard to the same chapter, the European Noise Directive requires member states to create strategic noise maps for important urban areas and transportation corridors, which they then use to develop and evaluate noise reduction policies.

Aircraft noise can be reduced by using quieter jet engines. Altering flight paths and time of day runway has benefited residents near airports.

== Legal status and regulation ==
=== Country-specific regulations ===
Up until the 1970s governments tended to view noise as a "nuisance" rather than an environmental problem.

Many conflicts over noise pollution are handled by negotiation between the emitter and the receiver. Escalation procedures vary by country, and may include action in conjunction with local authorities, in particular the police.

==== Egypt ====
In 2007, the Egyptian National Research Center found that the average noise level in central Cairo was 90 decibels and that the noise never fell below 70 decibels. Noise limits set by law in 1994 are not enforced. In 2018, the World Hearing Index declared Cairo to be the world's second-noisiest city.

==== India ====
Noise pollution is a major problem in India. The government of India has rules and regulations against firecrackers and loudspeakers, but enforcement is extremely lax. Awaaz Foundation is a non-governmental organization in India working to control noise pollution from various sources through advocacy, public interest litigation, awareness, and educational campaigns since 2003. Despite increased enforcement and stringency of laws now being practiced in urban areas, rural areas are still affected.

The Supreme Court of India had banned playing of music on loudspeakers after 10 p.m. In 2015, The National Green Tribunal directed authorities in Delhi to ensure strict adherence to guidelines on noise pollution, saying noise is more than just a nuisance as it can produce serious psychological stress. However, implementation of the law remains poor.

==== Sweden ====
How noise emissions should be reduced, without the industry being hit too hard, is a major problem in environmental care in Sweden today. The Swedish Work Environment Authority has set an input value of 80 dB for maximum sound exposure for eight hours. In workplaces where there is a need to be able to converse comfortably the background noise level should not exceed 40 dB. The government of Sweden has taken soundproofing and acoustic absorbing actions, such as noise barriers and active noise control.

==== United Kingdom ====
Figures compiled by rockwool, the mineral wool insulation manufacturer, based on responses from local authorities to a Freedom of Information Act (FOI) request reveal in the period April 2008 – 2009 UK councils received 315,838 complaints about noise pollution from private residences. This resulted in environmental health officers across the UK serving 8,069 noise abatement notices or citations under the terms of the Anti-Social Behavior (Scotland) Act. In the last 12 months, 524 confiscations of equipment have been authorized involving the removal of powerful speakers, stereos and televisions. Westminster City Council has received more complaints per head of population than any other district in the UK with 9,814 grievances about noise, which equates to 42.32 complaints per thousand residents. Eight of the top 10 councils ranked by complaints per 1,000 residents are located in London.

==== Canada ====
Canada's workplace noise regulations vary by several factors. Those include the number of hours of noise exposure, the maximum allowed decibels, and the exchange rate. The consistency of the decibel levels determines how long exposure can remain. A decibel exchange rate of 3 dB(A) allows a maximum decibel ceiling of 85 dB(A) per 8 hours.

Environmental background noise is separated into classes. Class 1 represents the sounds of urban environments, such as the daily commute. Class 2 is a mix of Class 1's requirements and Class 3's minimal traffic noise. Class 3 describes rural areas with less mechanical noise, such as farms, wildlife preserves/forests, and small communities. Class 4 is an environment that does not fall under the categories of Classes 1 and 2. The decibel rate determines regulation when divided into these classes.

Canada's Outdoor Consistent Noise Limits

Per Hour (Leq)

Time of Day	Class 1	Class 2	Class 3	Class 4
07:00–19:00	50 dB(A)	50 dB(A)	45 dB(A)	55 dB(A)
19:00-23:00	50 dB(A)	45 dB(A)	40 dB(A)	55 dB(A)

Noise monitoring is conducted to measure the sound coming from construction sites and other urbanization efforts, which will enforce the regulations provided in Canada's 'Canadian Environmental Protection Act' (CEPA). These devices detect sound levels, the duration of the sound, and provide measurements in decibels.

The Canadian Department of National Defence investigated noise pollution in the air and ocean near the Whiskey Hotel following a 2019 pause on military operations, in order to study how noise affects marine life. The study found that operations such as firing a weapon did not exceed the sound and behavioral thresholds in the air and underwater during training exercises.

Stakeholders (i.e., Indigenous communities) shared concern over potential noise pollution in the waters. In 2024, Canada proposed the 'Ocean Noise Strategy' in order to mitigate potential harm to marine life. Noise disruption poses a threat to animals that use echolocation for communication, as well as scaring off potential food sources for Indigenous peoples and other Canadian citizens. The goal of Canada's Ocean Noise Strategy is to gather information through various scientific research, find ways to collaborate with different government organizations, and raise awareness of the cause.

==== United States ====
The Noise Control Act of 1972 established a U.S. national policy to promote an environment for all Americans free from noise that jeopardizes their health and welfare. In the past, Environmental Protection Agency coordinated all federal noise control activities through its Office of Noise Abatement and Control. The EPA phased out the office's funding in 1982 as part of a shift in federal noise control policy to transfer the primary responsibility of regulating noise to state and local governments. However, the Noise Control Act of 1972 and the Quiet Communities Act of 1978 were never rescinded by Congress and remain in effect today, although essentially unfunded. As reported by the American Public Health Association, the United States Environmental Protection Agency's Office of Noise Abatement and Control has not been funded since the early 1980s, leaving the majority of environmental noise control to state and local governments. Considering federal leadership is limited, APHA calls for an updated noise control plan that would update exposure standards, collect health effect data, support noise monitoring and mapping, and offer technical support to local governments. A policy comparison of the United States, the United Kingdom, and the Netherlands reveal that U.S. lacks the integrated tools and national leadership required to effectively regulate environmental noise.

The National Institute for Occupational Safety and Health (NIOSH) at the Centers for Disease Control and Prevention (CDC) researches noise exposure in occupational settings and recommends a Recommended Exposure Limit (REL) for an 8-hour time-weighted average (TWA) or work shift of 85 dB(A) and for impulse noise (instant events such as bangs or crashes) of 140 dB(A). The agency published this recommendation along with its origin, noise measurement devices, hearing loss prevention programs, and research needs in 1972 (later revised June 1998) as an approach in preventing occupational noise-related hearing loss.

The Occupational Safety and Health Administration (OSHA) within the Department of Labor issues enforceable standards to protect workers from occupational noise hazards. The permissible exposure limit (PEL) for noise is a TWA of 90 dB(A) for an eight-hour work day. However, in manufacturing and service industries, if the TWA is greater than 85 dB(A), employers must implement a Hearing Conservation Program.

The Federal Aviation Administration (FAA) regulates aircraft noise by specifying the maximum noise level that individual civil aircraft can emit through requiring aircraft to meet certain noise certification standards. These standards designate changes in maximum noise level requirements by "stage" designation. The U.S. noise standards are defined in the Code of Federal Regulations (CFR) Title 14 Part 36 – Noise Standards: Aircraft Type and Airworthiness Certification (14 CFR Part 36). The FAA also pursues a program of aircraft noise control in cooperation with the aviation community. The FAA has set up a process to report for anyone who may be impacted by aircraft noise.

The Federal Highway Administration (FHWA) developed noise regulations to control highway noise as required by the Federal-Aid Highway Act of 1970. The regulations requires promulgation of traffic noise-level criteria for various land use activities, and describe procedures for the abatement of highway traffic noise and construction noise.

The Department of Housing and Urban Development (HUD) noise standards as described in 24 CFR part 51, Subpart B provides minimum national standards applicable to HUD programs to protect citizen against excessive noise in their communities and places of residence. For instance, all sites whose environmental or community noise exposure exceeds the day night average sound level (DNL) of 65 (dB) are considered noise-impacted areas, it defines "Normally Unacceptable" noise zones where community noise levels are between 65 and 75 dB, for such locations, noise abatement and noise attenuation features must be implemented. Locations where the DNL is above 75 dB are considered "Unacceptable" and require approval by the Assistant Secretary for Community Planning and Development.

The Department of Transportation's Bureau of Transportation Statistics has created a to provide access to comprehensive aircraft and road noise data on national and county levels. The map aims to assist city planners, elected officials, scholars, and residents to gain access to up-to-date aviation and Interstate highway noise information.

States and local governments typically have very specific statutes on building codes, urban planning, and roadway development. Noise laws and ordinances vary widely among municipalities and indeed do not even exist in some cities. An ordinance may contain a general prohibition against making noise that is a nuisance, or it may set out specific guidelines for the level of noise allowable at certain times of the day and for certain activities. Noise laws classify sound into three categories. First is ambient noise, which refers to sound pressure of all-encompassing noise associated with a given environment. The second is continuous noise, which could be steady or fluctuating, but continues for more than an hour. The third is cyclically varying noise, which could be steady or fluctuating, but occurs repetitively at reasonably uniform intervals of time.

New York City instituted the first comprehensive noise code in 1985. The Portland Noise Code includes potential fines of up to $5000 per infraction and is the basis for other major U.S. and Canadian city noise ordinances.

=== World Health Organization ===
==== European Region ====
In 1995, the World Health Organization (WHO) European Region released guidelines on regulating community noise. The WHO European Region subsequently released other versions of the guidelines, with the most recent version circulated in 2018. The guidelines provide the most up-to-date evidence from research conducted in Europe and other parts of the world on non-occupational noise exposure and its relationship to physical and mental health outcomes. The guidelines provide recommendations for limits and preventive measures regarding various noise sources (road traffic, railway, aircraft, wind turbine) for day-evening-night average and nighttime average levels. Recommendations for leisure noise in 2018 were conditional and based on the equivalent sound pressure level during an average 24-hour period in a year without weights for nighttime noise (LA_{eq, 24 hrs}); WHO set the recommended limit to 70 dB(A).

2018 WHO European Regional Office Environmental Noise Guidelines
Noise Source	Recommendation for Day-Evening-Night Average Level (L_{den})	Recommendation for Nighttime Average Noise (L_{night})
Road traffic	53 dB(A)	45 dB(A)
Rail	54 dB(A)	44 dB(A)
Aircraft	45 dB(A)	40 dB(A)
Wind turbine	45 dB(A)	no recommendation

== See also ==
- Acoustical engineering
- Aircraft noise pollution
- Buy Quiet
- Environmental hazard
- Environmental noise
- Health effects from noise
- Human auditory ecology
- Infrasound
- International Noise Awareness Day
- Light pollution
- Loud music
- Loudspeakers in mosques
- NIMBY
- Noise Abatement Society
- Noise and vibration on maritime vessels
- Noise control
- Noise measurement
- Noise map
- Noise regulation
- Occupational noise
- Ocean noise
- Safe listening
- World Hearing Day
