= Shield Group Security =

Former Iraqi security company

Shield Groups Security (SGS) was an Iraqi company that provided protection for businesses and organizations. It was established in 2003 and switched its name to National Shield Security (NSS) sometime after April 2006. According to the NSS's website, it has performed security services for infrastructure projects and performs extensive background checks on all "host country personnel". NSS offers services relating to security, threat assessment, satellite and radio communications, training, translation, and emergency planning.

Donald Vance, a US Navy veteran working for the company, suspected the company of illegal gun running when he noticed excessive stockpiling of weapons. He became an FBI informant alleging corruption on the part of the Iraqis running the company until he was arrested with American co-worker Nathan Ertel when American soldiers raided the company. Both Vance and Ertel were interrogated under suspicion of gun running and both allege that they were tortured. Ertel was released after one month of imprisonment; however, Vance was held for 97 days. It took the military three weeks to contact the FBI and confirm that Vance was an informant. The executives of the company have never been charged with any wrongdoing.
