= Appendix =

Appendix (pl.: appendices or appendixes) may refer to:

== In documents ==
- Addendum, an addition made to a document by its author after its initial printing or publication
- Bibliography, a systematic list of books and other works
- Index (publishing), a list of words or phrases with pointers to where related material can be found in a document

== Anatomy ==
- Appendix (anatomy), a part of the human digestive system
- A part of the spadix of certain plants within family Araceae

== Arts and media ==
- Appendix (band), a Finnish punk rock group
- The Appendix, a quarterly journal of history and culture
