= Suzanne Cusick =

American musicologist

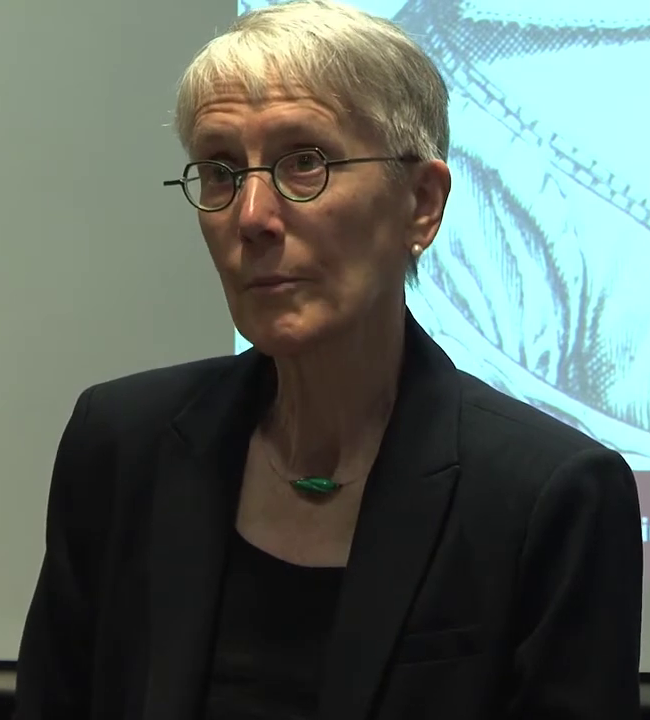
- Cusick in 2018

Academic work
- Discipline: Musicology
- Institutions: New York University

Suzanne G. Cusick is a music historian and musicologist living in and working in New York City, where she is a Professor of Music at the Faculty of Arts and Science at the New York University. Her specialties are the music of seventeenth-century Italy, feminist approaches to music history and criticism, and queer studies in music. She was also one of the first scholars to write about the use of music torture in the war on terror.

Cusick has been in charge of editing Women and Music. A Journal of Gender and Culture, the first journal which focuses on the relationship of gender and sexuality to musical culture.

Her book Francesca Caccini at the Medici Court: Music and the Circulation of Power (ISBN 9780226132129) was published by the University of Chicago Press in 2009, for which she received the 2010 book prize of the Society for the Study of Early Modern Women. This book deals with the life and works of Francesca Caccini while in the employment of the Medici court.

Suzanne Cusick was made an honorary member of the American Musicological Society in November 2014. She was president of the society from 2018 to 2020. She received her B.F.A. from Newcomb College (1969) and Ph.D. from the University of North Carolina at Chapel Hill (1975).

== See also ==
- Women in musicology
