= Benjamin Breen =

20th and 21st-century American historian

- Born: 1985 (age 40–41)

Academic background
- Education: University of Texas at Austin

Academic work
- Main interests: Early modern history, Portuguese history, History of medicine, Globalization, Science and technology studies
- Notable works: The Age of Intoxication: Origins of the Global Drug Trade (2019)

Benjamin Breen (born 1985) is an American historian of science and medicine. He is an associate professor of history at the University of California, Santa Cruz. His book The Age of Intoxication (2019) was awarded the 2021 William H. Welch Medal from the American Association for the History of Medicine.

== Education ==
Breen received his Ph.D. in history from the University of Texas at Austin in 2015. His doctoral advisor was Jorge Canizares-Esguerra.

== Research and writing ==
Breen’s work centers on the history of globalization and the long-term impacts of technological and environmental change. He has written on early modern globalization; the Portuguese Empire; Atlantic history; the early modern drug trade; the history of psychedelics; and the eighteenth-century impostor George Psalmanazar.

Between 2015 and 2017 Breen was a member of the Society of Fellows in the Humanities at Columbia University and a lecturer in Columbia's Department of History.

He was a co-founder and editor of The Appendix and writes the history blog Res Obscura and substack.

== Fellowships and awards ==
- 2021 The William H. Welch Medal of the American Association for the History of Medicine
- 2021 National Endowment for the Humanities Award for Faculty.
- 2014-15 Huntington Library visiting fellow of Lincoln College, Oxford.
- 2011-12 Fulbright Fellowship (Portugal).

== Books ==
- The Age of Intoxication: Origins of the Global Drug Trade (University of Pennsylvania Press, 2019). LCCN 2019-32803 ISBN 978-0-8122-5178-4 hbk; Breen, Benjamin (20 December 2019). 2019 pbk edition. University of Pennsylvania Press. ISBN 978-0-8122-9662-4.
- Tripping on Utopia: Margaret Mead, the Cold War, and the Troubled Birth of Psychedelic Science (Grand Central Publishing, 2024).
