= Maaban =

Maaban is a remote populated place in Ghana. Its coordinates are: Latitude (DMS): 6° 59′ 0″ N; Longitude (DMS): 2° 13′ 0″. Tribesmen from Maaban were studied by Rosen in a seminal study proving that hearing loss is primarily associated with exposure to elevated sound levels, rather than a function of ageing. Rosen's work also showed that high sound levels were responsible for a statistical elevation of blood pressure.

== See also ==
- Noise health effects
