= Music in psychological operations =

Psychological warfare and torture technique

- Type: Psychological warfare; torture
- Location: United States; Iraq; Greece; Israel; South Korea
- Effects: Sensory deprivation; sleep deprivation; food and drink deprivation, and stress positions

Music can be used as a tool of psychological warfare. The term "music torture" is sometimes used to describe the practice. While it is acknowledged by United States interrogation experts to cause discomfort, it has also been characterized as having no "long-term effects".

Music and sound have been usually used as part of a combination of interrogation methods, today recognized by international bodies as amounting to torture. Attacking all senses without leaving any visible traces, they have formed the basis of the widely discussed torture in Guantanamo and Abu Ghraib. They were, however, devised much earlier in the 1950s and early 1960s, as a way to counter so-called Soviet "brainwashing". Methods of "noise torture" or "sound torture", which include the continuous playing of music or noise, have been paired with sensory deprivation, sleep deprivation, food and drink deprivation, and stress positions.

== Instances of use ==
=== United States ===
- A BBC News report claimed that "Enter Sandman" by the American heavy metal band Metallica, along with music from the children's television programs Barney the Dinosaur and Sesame Street, were used for sleep deprivation and to culturally offend Iraqi POWs.
- Claimed to being used by the United States 361st Psychological Operations Company by Sergeant Mark Hadsell:

"These people haven't heard heavy metal. They can't take it. If you play it for 24 hours, your brain and body functions start to slide, your train of thought slows down and your will is broken. That's when we come in and talk to them."

- In the war on terror, the US used the songs "The Real Slim Shady" by Eminem, the Meow Mix theme song, and "Fuck Your God" by Deicide to torture.
- When the United States invaded Panama in December 1989, Manuel Noriega took refuge in the Holy See’s embassy on 24 December, which was immediately surrounded by U.S. troops. After being continually bombarded by hard rock music, including Van Halen's hit song "Panama", and The Howard Stern Show for several days, Noriega surrendered on 3 January 1990.
- According to the FBI:

"W[itness] observed sleep deprivation interviews w/strobe lights and loud music. Interrogator said it would take 4 days to break someone doing an interrogation 16 hrs w/lights and music on and 4 hrs off. Handwritten note next to typed synopsis says "ok under DoD policy".

"Rumors that interrogator bragged about doing lap dance on d[etainee], another about making d[etainee] listen to satanic black metal music for hours then dressing as a Priest and baptizing d[etainee] to save him – handwritten note says 'yes'."

"W[itness] saw d[etainee] in interview room sitting on floor w/Israeli flag draped around him, loud music and strobe lights. W suspects this practice is used by DOD DHS based on who he saw in the hallway."

- The Washington Post, quoting a leaked Red Cross report, wrote:

"The physical tactics noted by the Red Cross included placing detainees in extremely cold rooms with loud music blaring, and forcing them to kneel for long periods of time, the source familiar with the report said."

- The Hill, reporting on the #OccupyLafayettePark protests, wrote:

"A former adviser to Hillary Clinton hired a Mariachi band to play outside of the White House in an effort to disrupt President Trump's sleep on Wednesday night."

=== Iraq ===
According to Amnesty International:

"Detainees have reported being routinely subjected to cruel, inhuman or degrading treatment during arrest and detention. Many have told Amnesty International that they were tortured and ill-treated by US and UK troops during interrogation. Methods often reported include prolonged sleep deprivation; beatings; prolonged restraint in painful positions, sometimes combined with exposure to loud music; prolonged hooding; and exposure to bright lights. Virtually none of the allegations of torture or ill-treatment has been adequately investigated by the authorities."

=== Israel ===
On 12 January 1998 the Supreme Court of Israel declined to ban the use of loud music as an interrogation technique.

=== Greece ===
According to recent research, the Greek military Junta (1967–1974) used the above-mentioned combination of interrogation techniques, including music. This took place in the headquarters of the Special Interrogation Unit of Greek Military Police (EAT/ESA), Athens. New interviews with survivors, held there in 1973, talk about the use of songs, popular hits of the time: these were played loudly and repeatedly from loudspeakers as the detainee had to stand without rest, food, drink or sleep.

=== South Korea ===
South Korea has broadcast K-pop music across the Korean Demilitarized Zone (DMZ) into North Korea using loudspeakers. These operations were halted in 2018 following a thaw in inter-Korean relations.

=== New Zealand ===
During the 2022 Wellington protest, the Speaker of the New Zealand House of Representatives, Trevor Mallard, used the Parliament speakers to play music such as Macarena by Los Del Rio and Barry Manilow's back catalogue.

== Royalty payments ==
The Guardian reported that the US military may owe royalty payments to the artists whose works were played to the captives.

== Musicians' protests ==
On 9 December 2008 the Associated Press reported that various musicians were coordinating their objections to the use of their music as a technique for softening up captives through an initiative called Zero dB. Zero dB is an initiative against music torture set up by legal charity Reprieve, which represents over thirty prisoners in Guantanamo Bay. Zero dB aims to stop torture music by encouraging widespread condemnation of the practice and by calling on governments and the UN to uphold and enforce the Convention Against Torture and other relevant treaties. The initiative is backed by the Musicians Union which is calling on British musicians to voice their outrage against the use of music to torture.

Musicians and the wider public are making their own silent protests against music torture which are being shown on Zero dB. A series of silent protests and actions were planned through 2009. Participating musicians included minutes of silence in their concerts to draw their audience's attention to the USA's use of deafening music against captives.

According to the Associated Press FBI agents stationed at Guantanamo Bay reported that the use of deafening music was common. According to the Associated Press Guantanamo Bay spokesmen Commander Pauline Storum:

...wouldn't give details of when and how music has been used at the prison, but said it isn't used today. She didn't respond when asked whether music might be used in the future.

Among the musicians united in their objections were Christopher Cerf, a composer for the children's show Sesame Street, and Tom Morello of Rage Against the Machine and Audioslave. Others include Massive Attack, R.E.M., The Roots, Rise Against, Rosanne Cash, Pearl Jam, Bonnie Raitt, Trent Reznor, Billy Bragg, Michelle Branch, Jackson Browne, T-Bone Burnett, David Byrne, Marc Cohn, Steve Earle, Limp Bizkit, System of a Down, Disturbed, the Entrance Band, Skinny Puppy and Joe Henry.

The Associated Press reported that Stevie Benton of the group Drowning Pool commented: "I take it as an honor to think that perhaps our song could be used to quell another 9/11 attack or something like that." Benton later issued an apology, stating his comment had been "taken out of context".

== In popular culture ==
- In Paul Bowles's novel Up Above the World, Grove Sato tortures Dr. Slade and his wife with infrasounds and strange music, respectively, in an attempt to deduce whether they know of his murder of his mother.
- Following Metallica singer James Hetfield's comments supporting the use of his music to torture prisoners at Guantanamo Bay, British rock band Chumbawamba wrote the song "Torturing James Hetfield", where Hetfield is tortured by their music.
- In the episode "The Cell" of The Walking Dead, Daryl Dixon's captors use the upbeat song "Easy Street" as a torture tactic to prevent him from sleeping. Jim Bianco, the writer of the song, was initially confused by the show's request to use the song, but he called its use in the episode "a work of genius".
- The song "Methods Of Torture" by the band Negativland off their album Escape From Noise is about this topic, sampling people discussing sounds and music being used as torture, playing into the theme of the record about how noise hurts us in various ways.
- In Ozark Marty Byrde is tortured using the death metal song "Revolución" by Brujeria in Season 3, Episode 4 ("Boss Fight") by the Navarro cartel.

== See also ==
- Psychological torture
- Loud music
- High Anxiety
- Music and political warfare
- Gitmo playlist
- Psychic driving
- Acoustic harassment
- Sonic weapon
