= Loud music (disambiguation) =

Loud music is music played at a volume considered intolerable to others.

Loud Music may also refer to:

- Loud Music, an album by David Grissom
- "Loud Music" (song), a song by Michelle Branch

== See also ==
- No More Loud Music, an album by dEUS
- "Dim Lights, Thick Smoke (And Loud, Loud Music)", a song by Joe Maphis, Rose Lee Maphis and Max Fidler
