= The Cell (The Walking Dead) =

- The Walking Dead episode
- Dwight and Negan speak in private.
- Episode no.: Season 7 Episode 3
- Directed by: Alrick Riley
- Written by: Angela Kang
- Cinematography by: Michael E. Satrazemis
- Editing by: Avi Youabian
- Original air date: November 6, 2016
- Running time: 43 minutes

Guest appearances
- Christine Evangelista as Sherry; Michael Scialabba as Gordon; Joshua Hoover as Joseph; Tim Parati as Dr. Emmett Carson; Lindsley Register as Laura; Noah Benjamin as Red Haired Man; Elizabeth Ludlow as Arat

Episode chronology
← Previous "The Well"	Next → "Service"
- The Walking Dead season 7

"The Cell" is the third episode of the seventh season of the post-apocalyptic horror television series The Walking Dead, which aired on AMC on November 6, 2016. The episode was written by Angela Kang and directed by Alrick Riley.

The episode focuses on the Saviors living in an impressive community, the Sanctuary, that seems to have it all. Concurrently, Daryl (Norman Reedus) is held prisoner and psychologically tortured by Dwight (Austin Amelio), a ruthless but reluctant member of the Saviors and one of Negan's (Jeffrey Dean Morgan) top lieutenants, who forms a hostile rivalry with Daryl.

== Plot ==
Under Negan's orders, Daryl is taken to the Saviors' home, the Sanctuary, and locked in a dark cell, to be converted to join the Saviors by Dwight. Dwight feeds Daryl only dog food sandwiches and forces him to listen to the song "Easy Street" played through the walls. Dwight shows that if Daryl refuses to join the Saviors, he could end up like other prisoners, who have become walkers wandering in a fenced off area. Daryl attempts an escape one day when he finds his cell unlocked and despite Sherry finding him and warning him to do as he's told and to go back to his cell in which he doesn't listen to her and attempts it, but this is revealed to be a test by Negan of his loyalty. Negan threatens to smash Daryl's head with "Lucille", his bat, but Daryl doesn't flinch. Negan is impressed and leaves him be, though the other Saviors beat him up and return him to his cell.

Earlier, Negan had taunted Dwight about his relationship with Sherry and his loyalty, so to try to get into good favor with Negan, Dwight sets off to capture a Savior who has decided to leave. He finds the man, Gordon (Michael Scialabba), who begs to be killed rather than returned to Sanctuary. Dwight, after some thought, kills Gordon, and returns to Sanctuary to spend time with Sherry. He later visits Daryl and tapes a gruesome Polaroid photo of Glenn's mutilated body on the wall, blaming Daryl for his friend's death. Daryl breaks down into tears.

Dwight believes he has broken Daryl's spirit and takes him to meet Negan. Negan explains to Daryl how Dwight became one of his top men. Dwight, Sherry, and her sister Tina used to be part of the Sanctuary workforce, earning "points" for goods. However, Tina suffered from diabetes and fell behind on points. Negan offered the medication in exchange for Tina agreeing to marry him. While considering the offer, she, Dwight, and Sherry stole the medicine and ran away. Following Tina's death, Dwight and Sherry returned, asking Negan for forgiveness and sparing their lives, with Sherry offering herself in marriage to Negan. Negan agreed, but only after using a hot iron to burn half of Dwight's face in punishment.

Negan then explains to Daryl that he too can become one of his men if he answers one question: "Who are you?" Daryl refuses to answer with "Negan" and instead provides his own name, defying Negan. Negan orders Dwight to return him to his cell. Dwight yells at Daryl for jeopardizing his life, but Daryl responds that, like Dwight, he was thinking of someone else at the time that he decided whether or not to obey Negan.

== Reception ==
=== Critical reception ===
"The Cell" received generally positive reviews from critics, with particular praise towards Reedus’s performance. On Rotten Tomatoes, it holds a 74% with an average rating of 7.04 out of 10, based on 34 reviews. The site's consensus reads: The Walking Dead delivers another character-driven episode in "The Cell," which successfully delves deeper into the world of Negan and his cronies, even if its attempts to humanize a villain achieve somewhat mixed results.

Critic Ed Power of The Daily Telegraph praised the episode: "along comes an episode such as The Cell and you are reminded that at its finest the Walking Dead is one of the most quietly dazzling things on television." Kelly Lawler of USA Today reviewed the episode negatively, saying, "The Walking Dead spent its third episode physically and psychologically torturing yet another of its best and most beloved characters. And why did they do it? Because they had nothing else to do to push this tired and pointless Negan storyline along."

=== Ratings ===
The episode received a 5.7 rating in the key 18-49 demographic with 11.72 million total viewers. It is at the time the lowest rating the show has had since "Dead Weight" from season four.

=== Music ===
The song featured on the episode "Easy Street" by The Collapsable Hearts Club charted at number 92 on the UK Singles Chart a week after the episode aired. In the U.S., the song charted at number 50 on the Billboard Digital Songs chart, selling 21,000 copies as of November 22, 2016. Jim Bianco, the song's writer, called the use of the song in Daryl's torture "a work of genius".
