= Camp Cropper =

American facility in Baghdad, Iraq (2003–2011)

Camp Cropper
- Baghdad, Baghdad Governorate in Iraq

Site information
- Owner: Ministry of Defence
- Operator: United States Army

Location
- Shown within Iraq
- Coordinates: 33°14′34″N 44°13′12″E

Site history
- Built: April 2003
- In use: 2003 – July 2010

Camp Cropper was a holding facility for security detainees operated by the United States Army near Baghdad International Airport in Iraq. The facility was initially operated as a high-value detention site (HVD), but has since been expanded increasing its capacity from 163 to 2,000 detainees. Former Iraqi President Saddam Hussein was held there prior to his execution. Hussein was held at a nearby location outside the Camp Cropper complex. He was isolated from the former Ba'ath Party and subsequent HVT's held at the main Cropper facility.

The facility was handed over to Iraqi authorities in 2010 and subsequently renamed Al-Karkh Central Prison.

== History ==
Camp Cropper was established by the Headquarters and Headquarters Company (HHC) of the 115th Military Police Battalion in April 2003. It is named for Staff Sgt. Kenneth Cropper, a member of the Maryland Army National Guard who died in March 2002 while supporting security operations at the Pentagon. The facility was originally established as a High Value Detainee (HVD) holding area. Shortly after being established, its mission was expanded to also be a Corps Holding Area (CHA). Initially, the facility was meant to serve as "central booking" for the U.S. forces operating in Baghdad and central Iraq, though detainees from northern Iraq were brought there as well. After being processed at Camp Cropper detainees were supposed to be shipped to other detention facilities in Baghdad and throughout Iraq. However, in practice, this proved unworkable since most other prisons in Baghdad were badly damaged by looting after the fall of the Ba'ath regime.

Additional units to operate Camp Cropper include:

- 812th Military Police Company

U.S. Army Reserve from Orangeburg, New York to include backfill elements of 366th MP Company of Stillwater, Oklahoma. April–June 2003

- 443rd Military Police Company, U.S. Army Reserve from Owings Mills, Maryland, April–December 2003
- 186th Military Police Company, Iowa National Guard April 2003 and February 2008.
- 79th Military Police Company (Combat Support), U.S. Army Reserve Rochester, MN, Summer/Fall 2003-April 2004
- 141st Military Intelligence Battalion (LING), Utah Army National Guard, Orem, Utah- Command and Control (C2) for the Joint Intelligence Debriefing Center (JIDC), Task Force (TF) 134, November 2006 to October 2007.
- C & B Company, 2nd Battalion, 103d Armored Regiment, Pennsylvania Army National Guard, as part of the 89th and later 42nd Military Police Brigade.
- 439th Military Police Detachment, U.S. Army Reserve from Omaha, Nebraska.
- 324th Military Police Battalion, U.S. Army Reserve from Chambersburg, Pennsylvania

[CSC 1-107th Cavalry] Ohio National Guard, 2005

- 117th Military Police Battalion, Tennessee Army National Guard.
- 192nd Military Police Battalion, Connecticut Army National Guard, as part of the 89th Military Police Brigade from 2009 thru 2010

In August 2006, a combat support hospital was opened on Camp Cropper that would treat both coalition soldiers and detainees from Camp Cropper. The hospital was initially staffed by members of the 21st Combat Support Hospital from Fort Hood, Texas who transferred to the new facility after the closure of the Abu Ghraib detention facility. The 21st CSH was later replaced by the 31st Combat Support Hospital from Fort Bliss, Texas.

On March 15, 2007 military officials announced plans to once again expand Camp Bucca and Camp Cropper. Officials stated that this increase in capacity would be necessary to handle the detainees generated from the increased security operations in Baghdad.

In the summer of 2010 the Camp Cropper facility was turned over to the Iraqi government and renamed Karkh Prison.

A portion of Camp Cropper was still in use by the U.S. Army until December 2011 through the 40th Military Police Battalion, 15th Military Police Brigade, the 105th Military Police Battalion, 3rd Brigade 4th Infantry Division, Military Police Platoon, and 108th Military Police Company, 16th Military Police Brigade.

== Criticism ==
On 16 June 2004, The Pentagon confirmed a report in The New York Times that former CIA chief George Tenet had been allowed by former U.S. Secretary of Defense Donald Rumsfeld to have an Iraqi prisoner secretly detained at Camp Cropper since November, but denied they were trying to hide the prisoner from the International Committee of the Red Cross. Rumsfeld later told reporters that the prisoner was treated humanely. In 2003, the International Committee of the Red Cross was given regular and open access to the facility and the detainees, the Red Cross documented severe living conditions, harsh treatment by guards, and poor medical care.

In October 2006, the International Committee of the Red Cross reported the wounding of one American soldier to date by detainees. The attack was reported to have been under suspicious circumstances.

Since the closure of Abu Ghraib and the subsequent relocation to Camp Cropper, the larger prison had seen criticism for abuses of detainees and a hotbed of insurgent recruitment. Between October and December 2006, the MNF-I reported the deaths of three detainees at Camp Cropper. One from injuries inflicted by other detainees on October 29, two on November 30 and December 2 from natural causes. Other detainees died on 2007-04-04, 2007-05-26 and 2007-07-07.

In late April 2007, the former commander of Camp Cropper, Lieutenant Colonel William H. Steele was reported to be held in a military prison in Kuwait to await an Article 32 hearing. He was charged with various breaches of military law, including supplying an unmonitored cellphone to a detainee and inappropriate relationship with a detainee's daughter. On October 19, 2007, a military judge found Steele not guilty on the charge of aiding the enemy, but guilty of "unauthorized possession of classified documents, behavior unbecoming an officer for an inappropriate relationship with an interpreter and failing to obey a lawful order". Steele faced a possible maximum 6-year sentence for the charges he previously pleaded guilty to, as well as an additional 10 years for the charges for which he was convicted. Instead, he was sentenced to 2 years confinement, minus time already served, loss of his military retirement, forfeiture of pay and allowances and a dismissal from the military.

== Handover to Iraqi authorities ==
In July 2010, U.S. forces handed over control of Camp Cropper and its detainees to Iraqi authorities. U.S. officials, including Brig. Gen. Jerry Cannon, called it "the beginning of a new era," with Iraqi judicial authorities taking responsibility for security and oversight. A symbolic key was presented to Iraqi Justice Minister Dara Nur al-Din. Around 200 detainees, including eight senior figures from the former Ba'athist regime, remained under U.S. supervision.

After the handover of Camp Cropper, the facility came under full Iraqi administration and became known as Al-Karkh Central Prison. In February 2026, a U.S.-backed operation completed transferring approximately 5,700 ISIS detainees from Syria to Iraq, with many being held at the prison ahead of their trials. A month later, Iraq's Justice Ministry specifically noted that some projectiles had landed close to the prison during the Iran war, raising concerns about potential damage or security breaches.

== See also ==
- Tariq Aziz
- Human rights situation in post-Saddam Iraq
- Donald Vance
- Nathan Ertel
- Qais al-Khazali, former detainee
- Victory Base Complex
