= Loud music =

Music played at a high volume

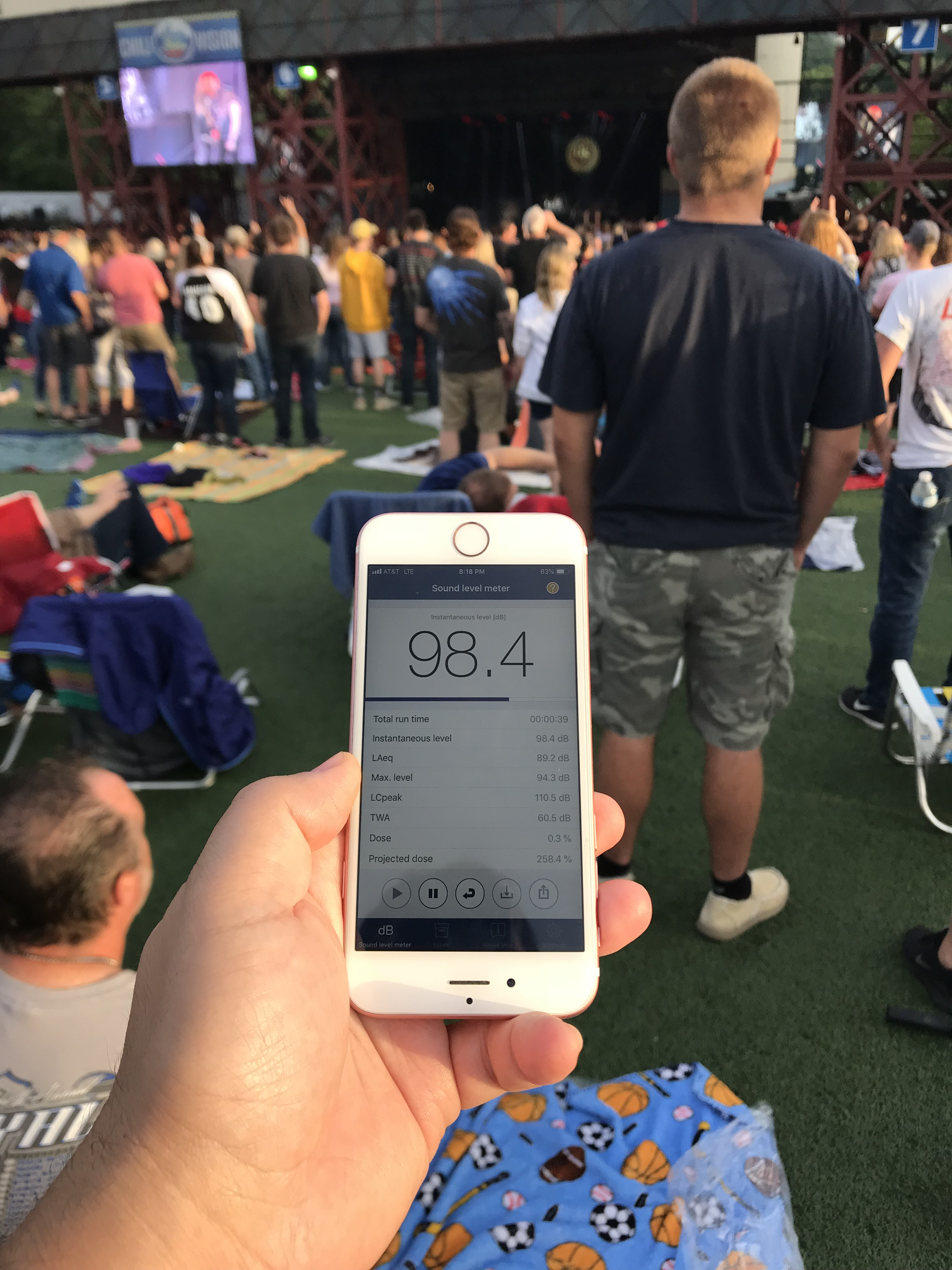
Music that is played at an extremely high volume can be annoying to others, is considered by many to be disrespectful, and can sometimes be unlawful.

Loud music is music that is played at a high volume, often to the point where it disturbs others and causes hearing damage. It may include music that is sung live, played with musical instruments, or with electronic media, such as radio broadcasting, CD, MP3 players, mobile phones and streaming services.

Playing loud music that can be heard by others in nearby properties is considered rude by many societies in many settings, and may result in loss of respect and legal action under the nuisance ordinance. In certain contained settings, such as nightclubs or concerts, music is often played very loudly, but is viewed as acceptable. Headphones allow loud music to be enjoyed without annoying others nearby, though leakage is an issue with headphones, and the listener will still be at risk of hearing damage.

== Criminal and civil penalties ==
Disturbing the peace by playing loud music at night is a criminal offense, typically a misdemeanor. The exact definition of what constitutes a loud music violation varies by location, either at a certain volume (measured in decibels) or the distance from the source at which the music can be heard. The time of day is also often a factor in the law, with the restrictions in some places applying only to specified nighttime hours (e.g. 11 PM-7 AM). The amount of effort put forth by law enforcement members to deal with loud music also varies by location.

The most common punishment for a conviction is a fine or some other small sanction. But on rare occasions, loud music may be grounds for imprisonment. In May 2008, a United Kingdom woman was sentenced to 90 days in jail for violating a court order not to play music that disturbed her neighbors eleven times.

Police have also at times discovered other crimes, such as illegal drug usage, when investigating loud music complaints.

Since mass transit agencies are frequently government-operated and/or subsidized, these rules can be legally enforced, and violations may result in prosecution.

In 2014, software engineer Michael Dunn was convicted of first-degree murder after fatally shooting 17-year-old Jordan Davis in an altercation over the loud music Davis was playing.

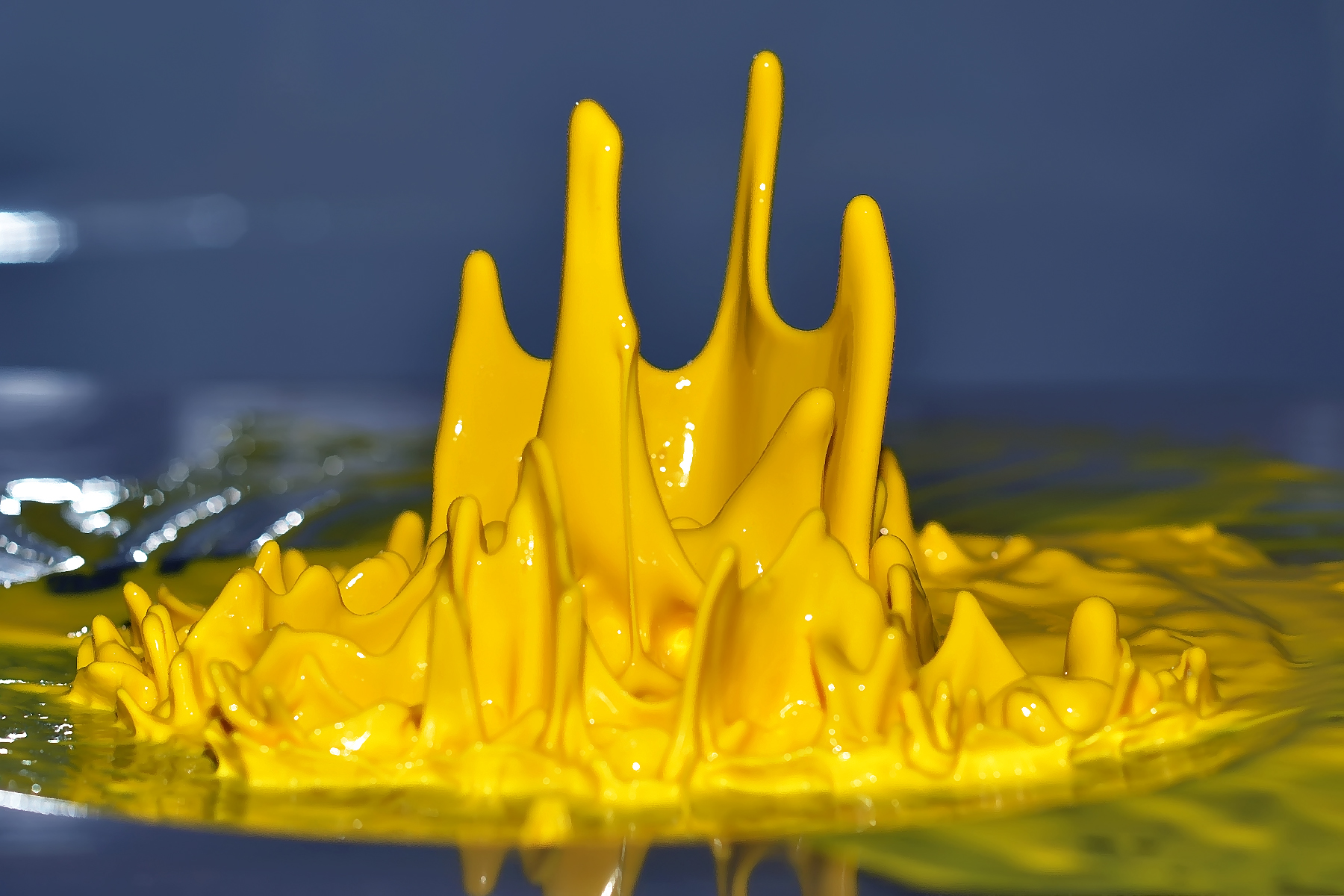
Yellow paint on a piece of film wrap over a bass speaker playing very loud music

In many settings, loud music is not tolerated by property owners, and may be grounds for certain civil actions, such as eviction from rented property.

Property owners at locations where patrons temporarily visit, such as hotels, campgrounds, or businesses, may order those who play loud music to leave the property.

David Grissom declared that “loud music is a forty-dollar fine,” the lead single from the 2008 album Loud Music, specifically citing experiences in municipalities such as Tulsa, Oklahoma, Amarillo, Texas and San Francisco, California.

== Health effects ==
Continual exposure to loud music may result in hearing loss. The National Institute for Occupational Safety and Health (NIOSH) has developed a set of recommendations aimed at protecting the hearing health of musicians and those who work in music and entertainment venues. Depending on the music sound levels and duration of exposure, as well as hearing protection used if any, the risk of hearing damage can vary significantly. Music played at 85 decibels, or level of sounds, for prolonged periods of times can cause hearing damage, for instance, sound levels at some rock concerts can reach 110-120 A-weighted decibels, and at those levels, the maximum daily limit set by most standards and regulations can be reached in less than one minute of exposure.

Continual exposure to loud music can also lead to tinnitus.

It is predicted that exposure to loud music will cause as many as 50 million Americans to develop hearing loss by 2050.

== Effects on alcohol consumption ==
A study conducted by French scientists have shown that loud music leads to more alcohol consumption in less time. Over three consecutive Saturday evenings researchers observed customers of two bars situated in a medium-sized city in the west of France. Participants included forty males aged between 18 and 25, who were unaware that they were subjects of research. The study featured only those who ordered a glass of draft beer (25 cl. or 8 oz.). The lead researcher, Nicolas Guéguen, said that each year more than 70,000 people in France die from an increased level of alcohol consumption, which can also leads to fatal car accidents.

== Lethal disputes ==
Loud music has in some instances provoked lethal responses.

In 2012, Michael Dunn shot and murdered Jordan Davis, a Black teenager, over loud music being played in a gas station parking lot.

In 2023, a Bronx woman allegedly stabbed her neighbor over the loud music that was disturbing her.

In 2024, a man in Atlanta who had shot and killed his roommate over loud music was found guilty of the killing which had occurred in November 2022.

== See also ==
- Earmuff
- Earplug
- Hearing impairment
- Heavy metal music
- Hip hop music
- Loudest band in the world
- Loud Records
- Music torture
- Noise induced hearing loss
- Noise regulation
- Safe listening
- Sound
- Sound power level
- Soundproofing
- Tinnitus
