= Donald Vance =

American Navy veteran (born c. 1976)

Donald Vance (born c. 1976) is an American Navy veteran who was held in detention at Camp Cropper, the United States military's maximum-security detention site in Baghdad for 97 days beginning in April 2006. On December 18, 2006, Vance filed suit against the US government and the former US Secretary of Defense, Donald H. Rumsfeld, on grounds that he was tortured and his rights of habeas corpus were violated.

He won the 2007 Ron Ridenhour Truth-Telling Prize for coming forward with his story on April 4, 2007.

== Background ==
Vance was a 29-year-old Navy veteran from Chicago when he went to Iraq as a security contractor. Vance became an unpaid informant for the F.B.I., passing them evidence that seemed to suggest that the Iraqi security firm at which he worked might be engaged in illegal weapons trading, particularly to officials from the Iraqi Interior Ministry.

However, when American soldiers raided the firm, he was treated as a suspect. Another American who worked for the company but had resigned over the alleged weapons trading, Nathan Ertel, was also detained. Vance was held for three months at Camp Cropper, America's maximum security prison site in Baghdad.

== Incarceration ==
Vance claims he was subject to interrogations, inhumane treatment and sleep deprivation techniques during his time at Camp Cropper. A Pentagon spokeswoman, First Lt. Lea Ann Fracasso, claimed the men had been "treated fair and humanely", and that there was no record of either man complaining about his treatment. Though officials were informed by his F.B.I. handler that he was an informant after his first three weeks of detention, they decided that he still "posed a threat". He took notes on his imprisonment and smuggled them out in a Bible.

Although denied legal representation at his detainment hearing on 24 April, he was allowed to attend it because he was an American. Two weeks into his detention, he was allowed to phone his fiancée in Chicago, who had already informed her Congressional representative of his apparent disappearance. He wrote ten letters home, one of which arrived in November 2006 dated 17 July.

After three months, officials decided to release him after further review of his case.

== Legal case ==
On December 18, 2006, Vance filed suit against the US government and the former US Secretary of Defense, Donald H. Rumsfeld, on grounds that he was tortured and his rights of habeas corpus were violated. He was represented by Arthur Loevy, Jon Loevy and Michael Kanovitz of the law firm Loevy & Loevy. His suit against the US government and Donald Rumsfeld alleged that he was subject to the following unlawful procedures:

1. false arrest
2. unlawful detention
3. unlawful search and seizure
4. denial of right to counsel in interrogations - coerced statements
5. denial of Sixth Amendment right to counsel
6. denial of right to confront adverse witnesses
7. denial of right to present witnesses and evidence, and to have exculpatory evidence disclosed
8. unlawful conditions of detention
9. denial of necessary medical care
10. denial of property without due process

On August 8, 2011, the United States Court of Appeals for the Seventh Circuit in Chicago ruled that Vance and Nathan Ertel may proceed to sue Rumsfeld. The ruling allowed the two plaintiffs to subpoena government documents and to compel sworn testimony about U.S. torture policies. Prior to the appellate court's ruling, courts had generally refrained from allowing such suits related to federal government conduct in zones of military conflict, granting government agents qualified immunity under the Bivens doctrine. In its opinion, the Court asked, "On what conceivable basis could a U.S. public official possibly conclude that it was constitutional to torture U.S. citizens?" With reference to the defendants' arguments for immunity, the Court wrote that "The [defense] theory would immunize every enlisted soldier in the war zone and every official in between … for deliberate torture and even coldblooded murder of civilian U.S. citizens." In October 2011, however, the 7th Circuit agreed to rehear the case en banc, vacating the prior opinion. The 7th Circuit Court dismissed the case in November 2012.
