= The Appendix =

Online magazine

- A screenshot of The Appendix homepage on September 5, 2013.
- Editor-in-chief: Christopher Heaney
- Categories: History, literature, culture
- Frequency: Quarterly
- Founded: 2012
- Final issue: 2015
- Country: United States
- Based in: Austin
- Website: theappendix.net

The Appendix was an online magazine of "narrative and experimental history." It was co-founded in the fall of 2012 by Benjamin Breen, Felipe Cruz, Christopher Heaney, and Brian Jones. A stated goal of the journal is that "scholarly and popular history need to come together." It ceased publication in 2015 after publishing eight quarterly issues.

The journal featured articles from historians, anthropologists, artists, journalists, and other writers. The journal has been praised by Lapham's Quarterly, The Public Domain Review, Dan Cohen, and the blog of the American Historical Association.

Material from The Appendix has been featured on the websites of The Atlantic, Slate, Jezebel, and the Smithsonian Magazine.
