= Aircraft noise pollution =

Noise generated by powered aircraft

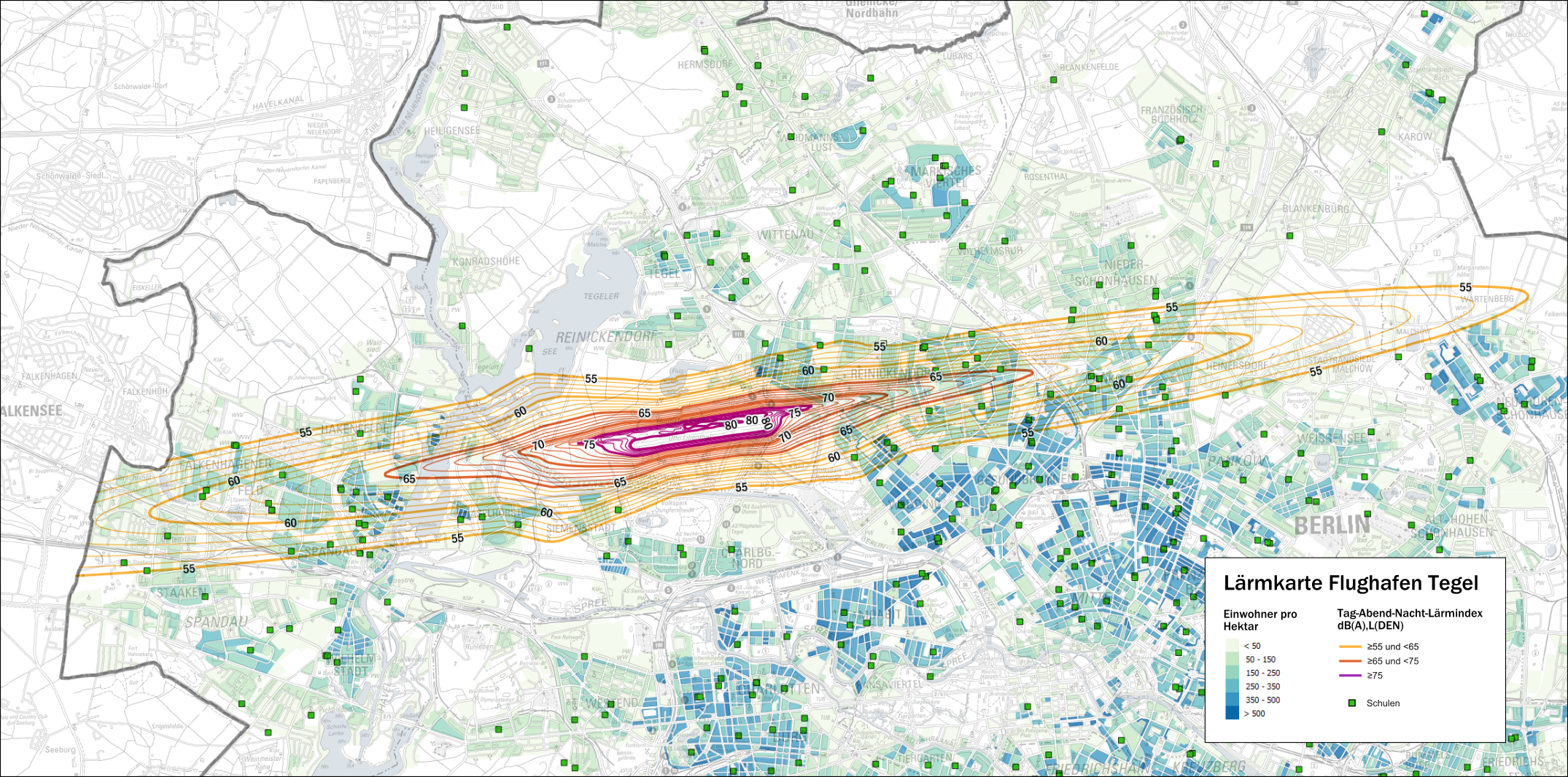
Noise map of Berlin Tegel Airport

Aircraft noise pollution refers to noise produced by aircraft in flight that has been associated with several negative stress-mediated health effects, from sleep disorders to cardiovascular disorders. Governments have enacted extensive controls that apply to aircraft designers, manufacturers, and operators, resulting in improved procedures and cuts in pollution.

== Mechanisms of sound pollution ==
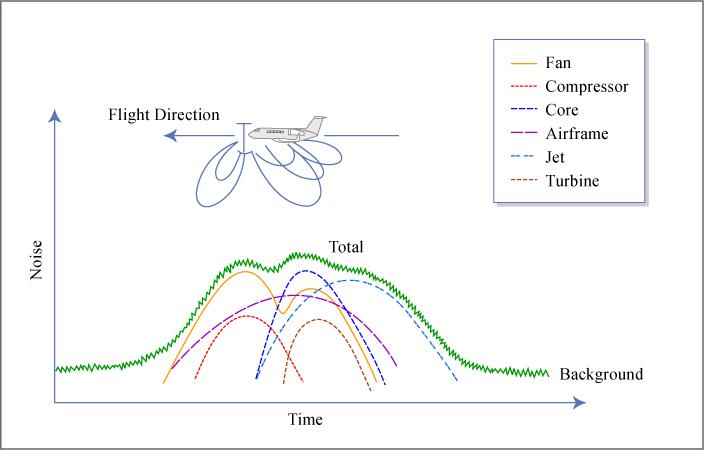
Aircraft noise radiation as measured on the ground.

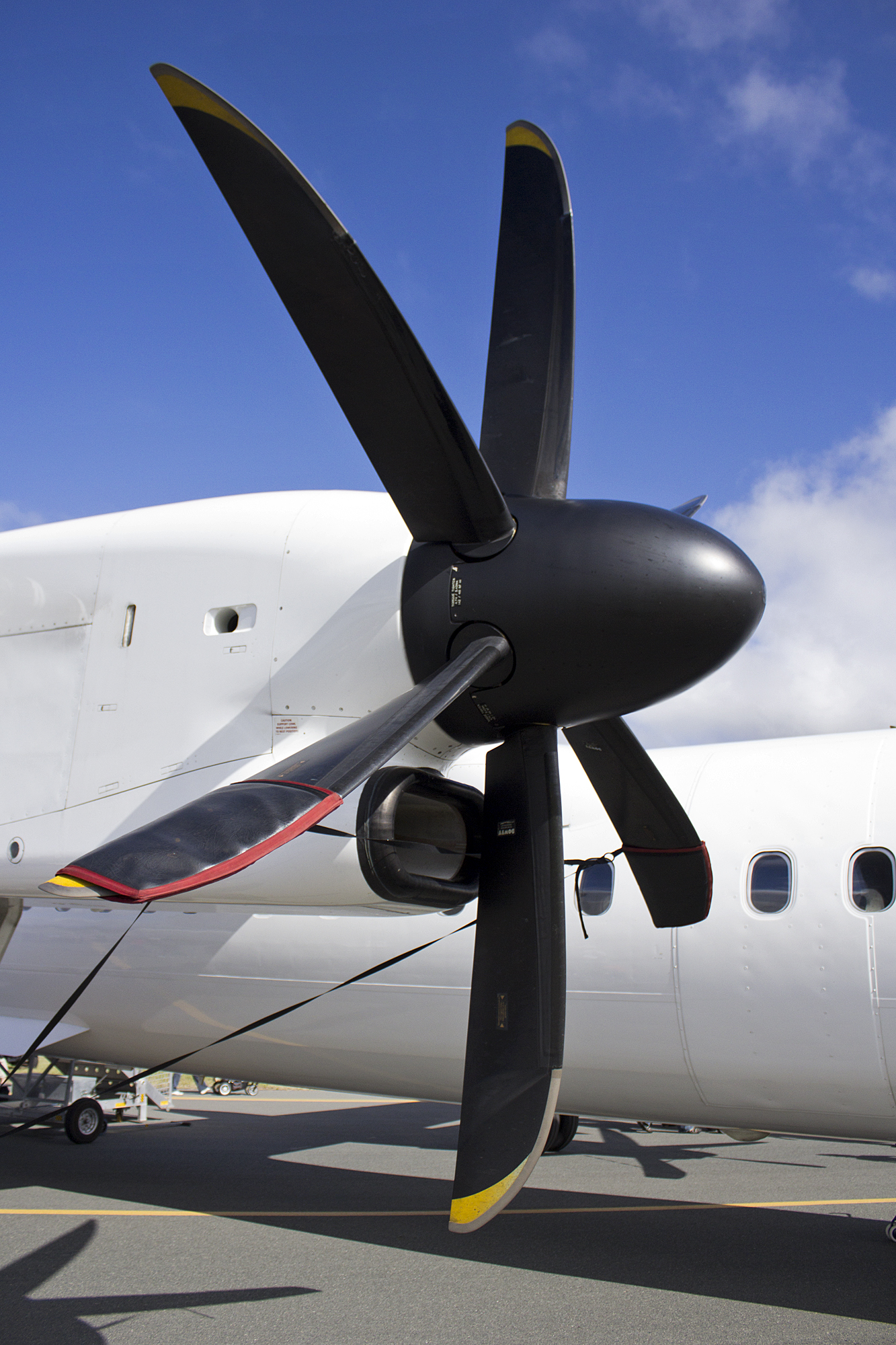
Noise-generating aircraft propeller

Aircraft noise is noise pollution produced by an aircraft or its components, whether on the ground while parked such as auxiliary power units, while taxiing, on run-up from propeller and jet exhaust, during takeoff, underneath and lateral to departure and arrival paths, over-flying while en route, or during landing. A moving aircraft including the jet engine or propeller causes compression and rarefaction of the air, producing motion of air molecules. This movement propagates through the air as pressure waves. If these pressure waves are strong enough and within the audible frequency spectrum, a sensation of hearing is produced. Different aircraft types have different noise levels and frequencies. The noise originates from three main sources:

- Engine and other mechanical noise—rotation of the engine parts, most noticeable when fan blades reach supersonic speeds.
- Aerodynamic noise—from the airflow around the surfaces of the aircraft, especially when flying low at high speeds.
- Noise from aircraft systems—cockpit, cabin pressurization, conditioning systems, and Auxiliary Power units.

=== Engine and other mechanical noise ===
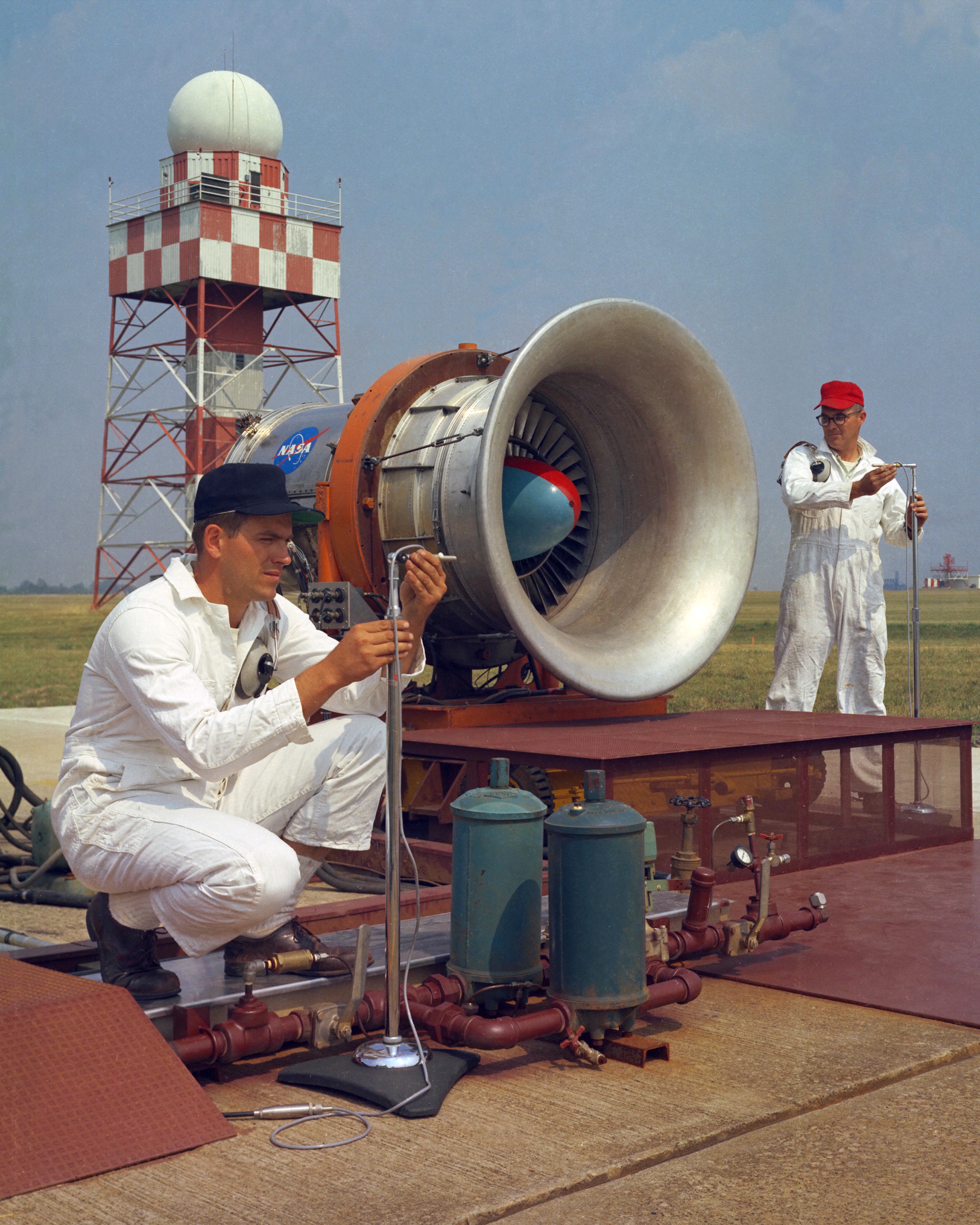
NASA researchers at Glenn Research Center measuring jet engine noise in 1967

Much of the noise in propeller aircraft comes equally from the propellers and aerodynamics. Helicopter noise is aerodynamically induced noise from the main and tail rotors and mechanically induced noise from the main gearbox and various transmission chains. The mechanical sources produce narrow band high intensity peaks relating to the rotational speed and movement of the moving parts. In computer modelling terms, noise from a moving aircraft can be treated as a line source.

Aircraft gas turbine engines (jet engines) are responsible for much of the aircraft noise during takeoff and climb, such as the buzzsaw noise generated when the tips of the fan blades reach supersonic speeds. However, with advances in noise reduction technologies—the airframe is typically more noisy during landing.

The majority of engine noise heard is due to jet noise—although high bypass-ratio turbofans do have considerable fan noise. The high velocity jet leaving the back of the engine has an inherent shear layer instability (if not thick enough) and rolls up into ring vortices. This later breaks down into turbulence. The Sound Pressure Level,SPL, associated with engine noise is proportional to the jet speed (to a high power). Therefore, even modest reductions in exhaust velocity will produce a large reduction in jet noise.

Engines are the main source of aircraft noise. The geared Pratt & Whitney PW1000G helped reduce the noise levels of the Bombardier CSeries, Mitsubishi MRJ and Embraer E-Jet E2 crossover narrowbody aircraft: the gearbox allows the fan to spin at an optimal speed, which is one third the speed of the LP turbine, for slower fan tip speeds. It has a 75% smaller noise footprint than current equivalents. The PowerJet SaM146 in the Sukhoi Superjet 100 features 3D aerodynamic fan blades and a nacelle with a long mixed duct flow nozzle to reduce noise.

=== Aerodynamic noise ===
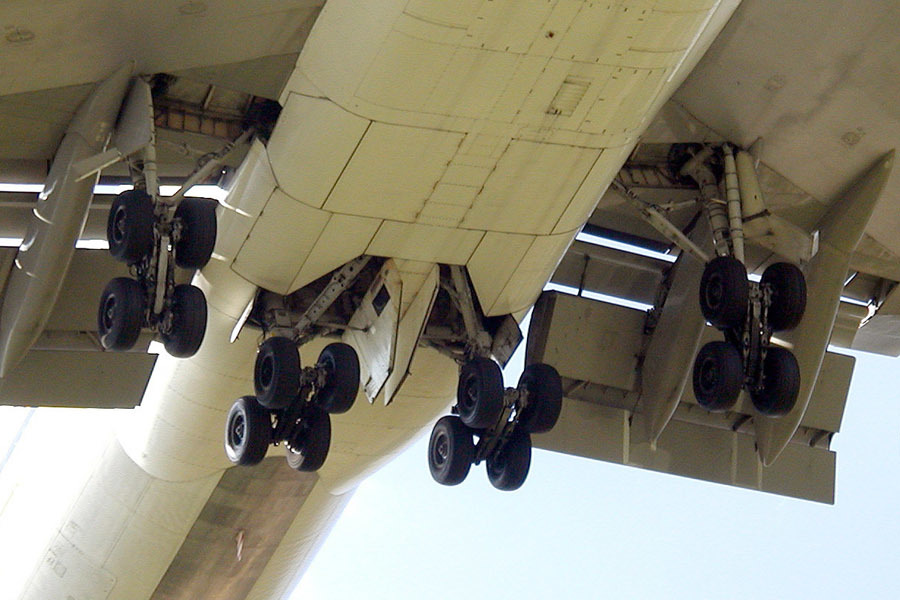
Deployed landing gear and wing flaps of a 747

Aerodynamic noise arises from the airflow around the aircraft fuselage and control surfaces. This type of noise increases with aircraft speed and also at low altitudes due to the density of the air. Jet-powered aircraft create intense noise from aerodynamics. Low-flying, high-speed military aircraft produce especially loud aerodynamic noise.

The shape of the nose, windshield or canopy of an aircraft affects the sound produced. Much of the noise of a propeller aircraft is of aerodynamic origin due to the flow of air around the blades. The helicopter main and tail rotors also give rise to aerodynamic noise. This type of aerodynamic noise is mostly low frequency determined by the rotor speed.

Typically noise is generated when flow passes an object on the aircraft, for example, the wings or landing gear. There are broadly two main types of airframe noise:

- Bluff Body Noise – the alternating vortex shedding from either side of a bluff body, creates low-pressure regions (at the core of the shed vortices) which manifest themselves as pressure waves (or sound). The separated flow around the bluff body is quite unstable, and the flow "rolls up" into ring vortices—which later break down into turbulence.
- Edge Noise – when turbulent flow passes the end of an object or gaps in a structure (high lift device clearance gaps) the associated fluctuations in pressure are heard as the sound propagates from the edge of the object (radially downwards).

==== Sonic boom ====
Sonic boom sound
Sonic boom sound made by an F/A-18 passing overhead

Conical shockwave with its hyperbola-shaped ground contact zone in yellow

Sonic booms due to large supersonic aircraft can be particularly loud and startling, tend to awaken people, and may cause minor damage to some structures. This led to the prohibition of routine supersonic flight overland. Although sonic booms cannot be completely prevented, research suggests that with careful shaping of the vehicle, the nuisance due to sonic booms may be reduced to the point that overland supersonic flight may become a feasible option.

=== Noise from aircraft systems ===
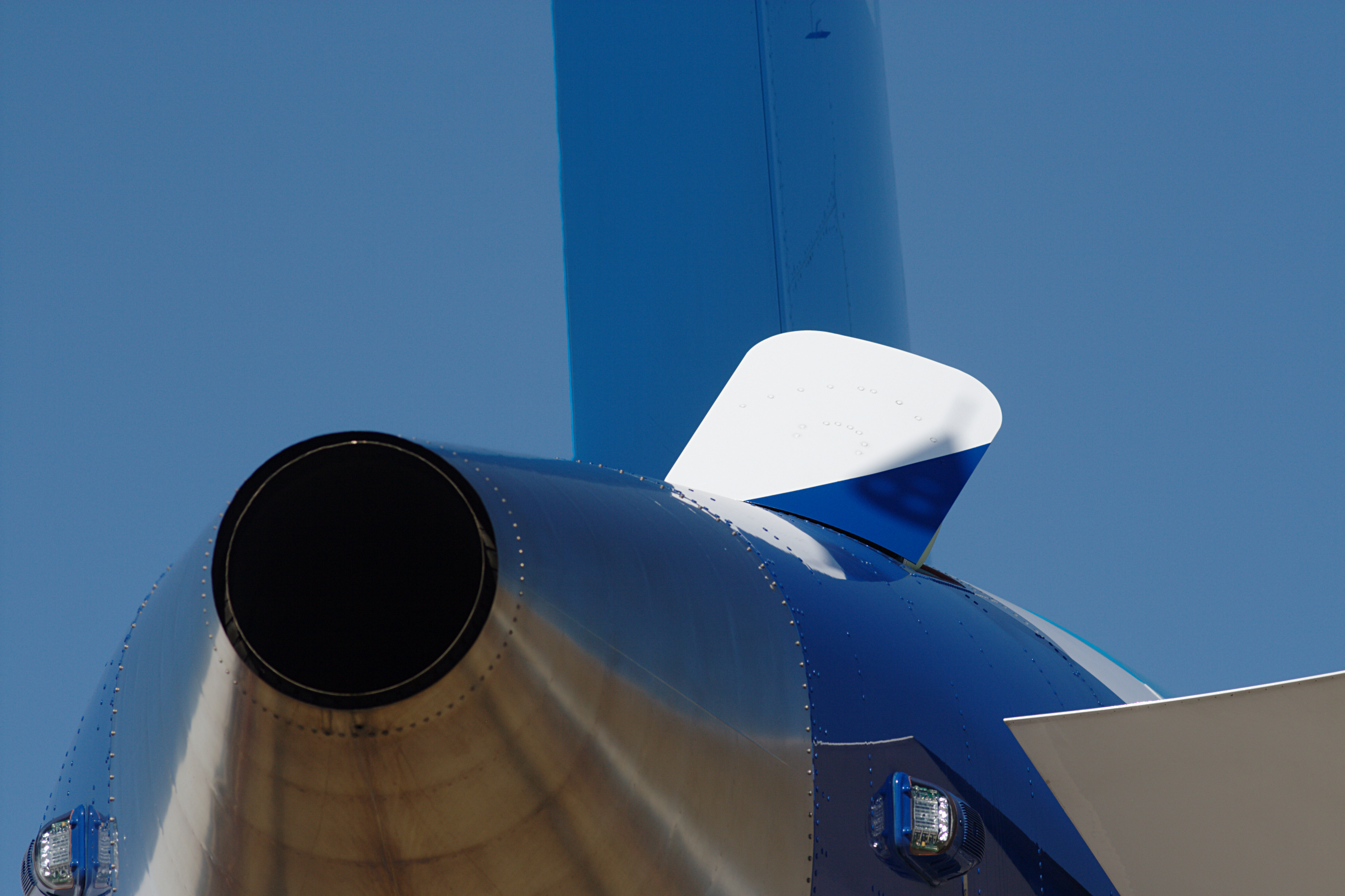
The APU exhaust on a Boeing 787 tail, with intake panel open

Cockpit and cabin pressurization and conditioning systems are often a major contributor within cabins of both civilian and military aircraft. However, one of the most significant sources of cabin noise from commercial jet aircraft, other than the engines, is the Auxiliary Power Unit (APU), an on‑board generator used in aircraft to start the main engines, usually with compressed air, and to provide electrical power while the aircraft is on the ground. Other internal aircraft systems can also contribute, such as specialized electronic equipment in some military aircraft.

== Health effects ==
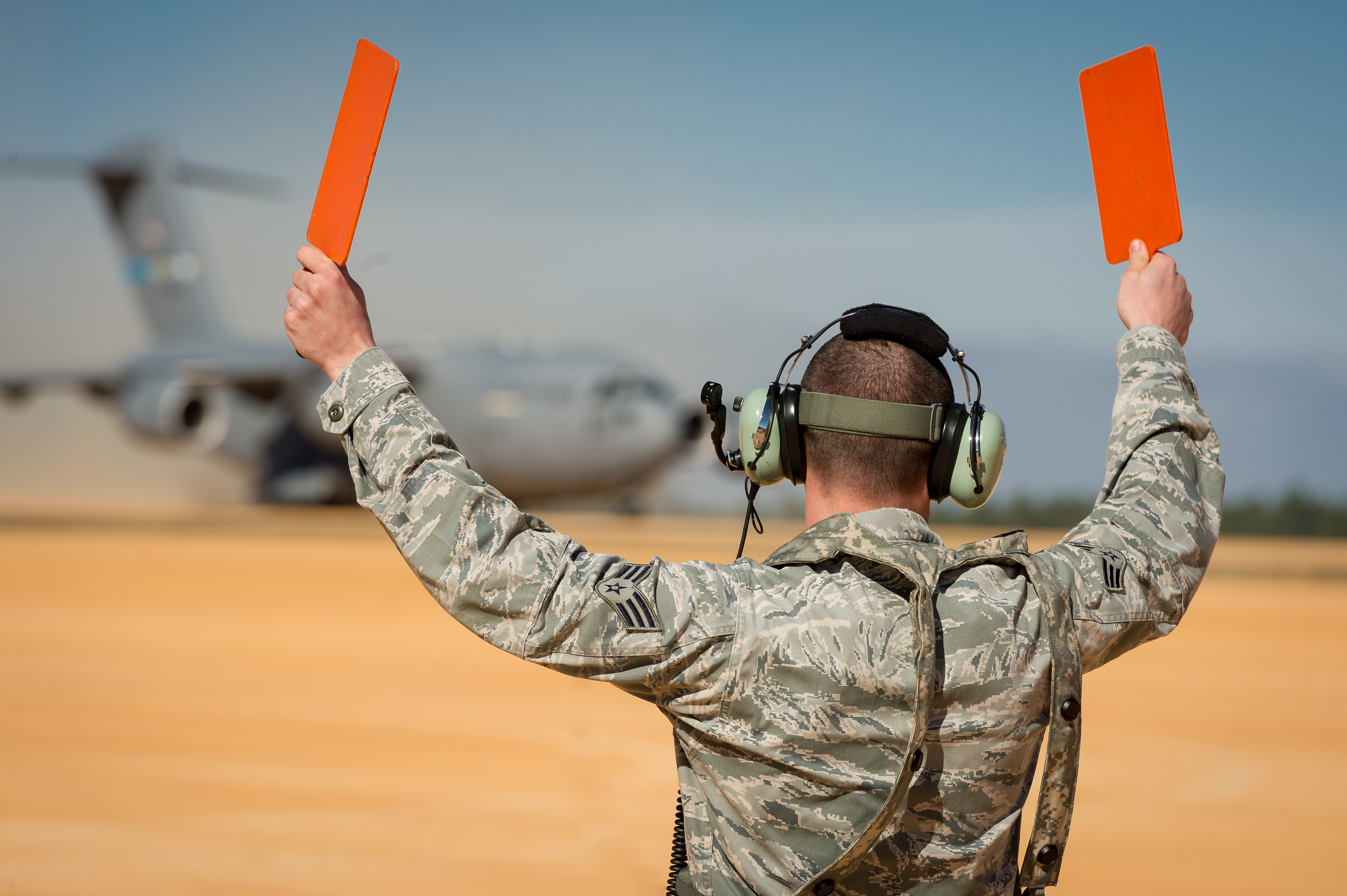
Aircraft marshallers wearing hearing protection

Aircraft engines are the major source of noise and can exceed 140 decibels (dB) during takeoff. While airborne, the main sources of noise are the engines and the high speed turbulence over the fuselage.

There are health consequences of elevated sound levels. Elevated workplace or other noise can cause hearing impairment, hypertension, ischemic heart disease, annoyance, sleep disturbance, and decreased school performance. Although some hearing loss occurs naturally with age, in many developed nations the impact of noise is sufficient to impair hearing over the course of a lifetime. Elevated noise levels can create stress, increase workplace accident rates, and stimulate aggression and other anti-social behaviors. Airport noise has been linked to high blood pressure. Aircraft noise increases risks of heart attacks.

=== German environmental study of aircraft noise ===
A large-scale statistical analysis of the health effects of aircraft noise was undertaken in the late 2000s by Bernhard Greiser for the Umweltbundesamt, Germany's central environmental office. The health data of over one million residents around the Cologne airport were analysed for health effects correlating with aircraft noise. The results were then corrected for other noise influences in the residential areas, and for socioeconomic factors, to reduce possible skewing of the data.

The German study concluded that aircraft noise clearly and significantly impairs health. For example, a day-time average sound pressure level of 60 decibels increased coronary heart disease by 61% in men and 80% in women. As another indicator, a night-time average sound pressure level of 55 decibels increased the risk of heart attacks by 66% in men and 139% in women. Statistically significant health effects did however start as early as from an average sound pressure level of 40 decibels.

=== FAA advice on aircraft noise ===
The Federal Aviation Administration (FAA) regulates the maximum noise level that individual civil aircraft can emit through requiring aircraft to meet certain noise certification standards. These standards designate changes in maximum noise level requirements by "stage" designation. The U.S. noise standards are defined in the Code of Federal Regulations (CFR) Title 14 Part 36 – Noise Standards: Aircraft Type and Airworthiness Certification (14 CFR Part 36). The FAA says that a maximum day-night average sound level of 65 dB is incompatible with residential communities. Communities in affected areas may be eligible for mitigation such as soundproofing.

=== Cabin noise effects and measurements ===
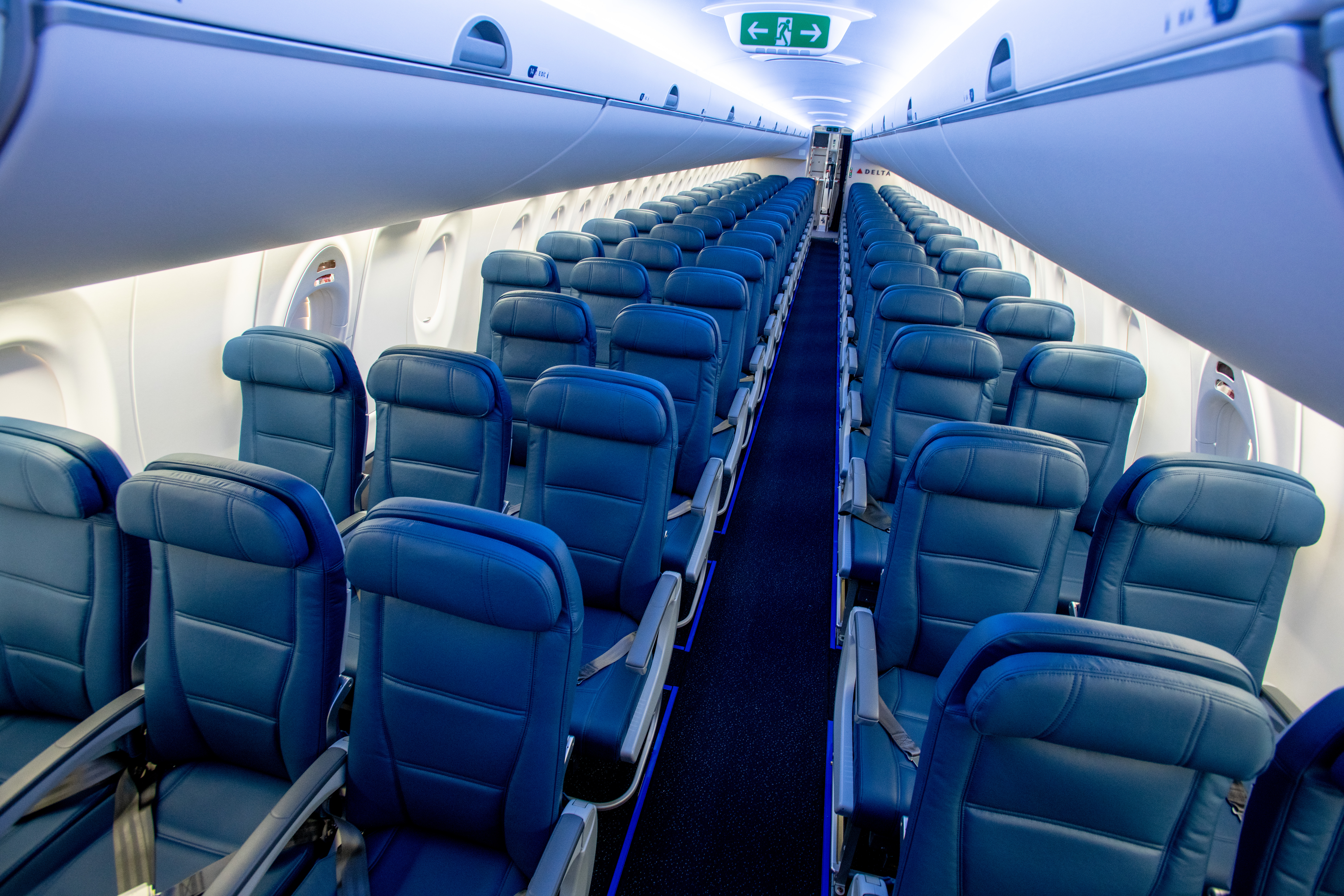
Typical passenger aircraft cabin

Aircraft noise also affects people within the aircraft: crew and passengers. Cabin noise can be studied to address the occupational exposure and the health and safety of pilots and flight attendants. In 1998, 64 commercial airline pilots were surveyed regarding hearing loss and tinnitus. In 1999, the NIOSH conducted several noise surveys and health hazard evaluations, and found noise levels exceeding its recommended exposure limit of 85 A-weighted decibels as an 8-hr TWA. In 2006, the noise levels inside an Airbus A321 during cruise have been reported as approximately 78 dB(A) and during taxi when the aircraft engines are producing minimal thrust, noise levels in the cabin have been recorded at 65 dB(A). In 2008, a study of Swedish airlines cabin crews found average sound levels between 78 and 84 dB(A) with maximum A-weighted exposure of 114 dB but found no major hearing threshold shifts. In 2018, a study of sound levels measured on 200 flights representing six aircraft groups found media noise level of 83.5 db(A) with levels reaching 110 dB(A) on certain flights, but only 4.5% exceeded the NIOSH recommended 8-hr TWA of 85 dB(A).

=== Cognitive effects ===
Simulated aircraft noise at 65 dB(A) has been shown to negatively affect individuals’ memory and recall of auditory information. In one study comparing the effect of aircraft noise to the effect of alcohol on cognitive performance, it was found that simulated aircraft noise at 65 dB(A) had the same effect on individuals’ ability to recall auditory information as being intoxicated with a Blood Alcohol Concentration (BAC) level of at 0.10. A BAC of 0.10 is double the legal limit required to operate a motor vehicle in many developed countries such as Australia.

== Noise mitigation programs ==
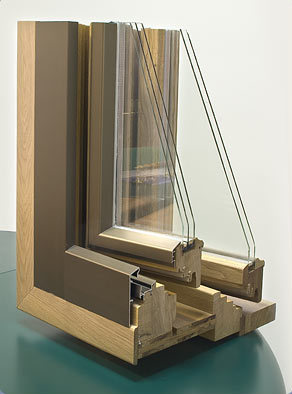
Insulated glazing provides noise mitigation

In the United States, since aviation noise became a public issue in the late 1960s, governments have enacted legislative controls. Aircraft designers, manufacturers, and operators have developed quieter aircraft and better operating procedures. Modern high-bypass turbofan engines, for example, are notably more quiet than the turbojets and low-bypass turbofans of the 1960s. FAA Aircraft Certification achieved noise reductions classified as "Stage 3" aircraft; which has been upgraded to "Stage 4" noise certification resulting in quieter aircraft. This has resulted in lower noise exposures in spite of increased traffic growth and popularity.

In the 1980s, the U.S. Congress authorized the FAA to devise programs to insulate homes near airports. While this does not address the external noise, the program has been effective for residential interiors. Some of the airports where the technology was first applied were San Francisco International Airport and San Jose International Airport in California. A computer model is used which simulates the effects of aircraft noise upon building structures. Variations of aircraft type, flight patterns and local meteorology can be studied. Then, the benefits of building retrofit strategies such as roof upgrading, window glazing improvement, fireplace baffling, caulking construction seams can be evaluated.

=== Regulations ===
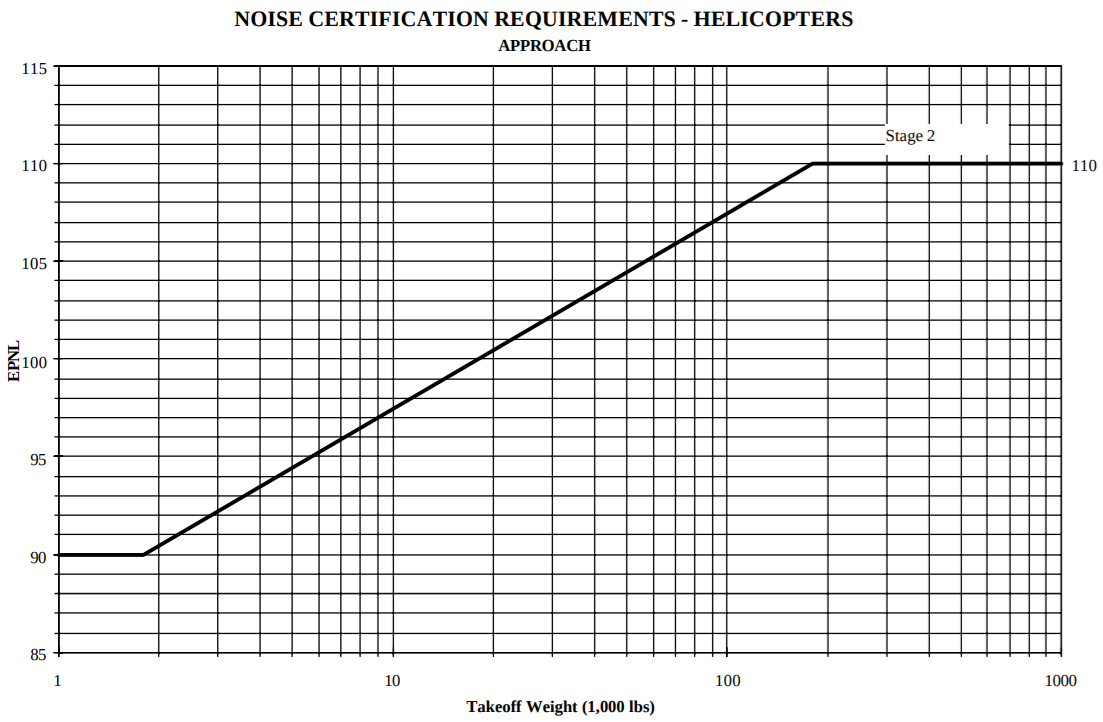
Helicopters stage 2 Noise standard: approach

Noise stages are defined in the US Code of Federal Regulations (CFR) Title 14 Part 36. For civil aircraft, the US FAA Stage 1 is the loudest and Stage 4 is the quietest. Stage 3 was required for all large jet and turboprop aircraft at US civilian airports from the year 2000, and at least Stage 2 for under 75,000 lb (34 t) MTOW jets until December 31, 2015. The previous was Stage 4 for large airplanes, equivalent to the ICAO Annex 16, Volume 1 Chapter 4 standards, while the more stringent Chapter 14 became effective July 14, 2014, and was adopted by the FAA as Stage 5 from January 14, 2016, effective for new type certificates from December 31, 2017, or December 31, 2020 depending on weight.

The US allows both the louder Stage 1 and quiet Stage 2 helicopters. The quietest Stage 3 helicopter noise standard became effective on May 5, 2014, and are consistent with ICAO Chapter 8 and Chapter 11.

ICAO Noise Standards
Chapter	Year	Ch. 3 Margin	Types
-------------	-------------	-------------	Boeing 707, Douglas DC-8
2	1972	~+16 dB	Boeing 727, McDonnell Douglas DC-9
3	1978	baseline	Boeing 737 Classic, MD-80
4 (stage 4)	2006	−10 dB	Airbus A320, Boeing 737NG, Boeing 767, Boeing 747-400
14 (stage 5)	2017–2020	−17 dB	Airbus A320, Airbus A320neo, Airbus A330, Airbus A350, Airbus A380, Boeing 737 MAX, Boeing 747-8, Boeing 757, Boeing 777, Boeing 777X (service entry by 2026-27), Boeing 787

==== Night flying restrictions ====
At Heathrow, Gatwick and Stansted airports in London, UK and Frankfurt Airport in Germany, night flying restrictions apply to reduce noise exposure at night.

=== Technological advances ===
==== Engine design ====
Modern high bypass turbofans are not only more fuel efficient, but also much quieter than older turbojet and low-bypass turbofan engines. On newer engines noise-reducing chevrons further reduce the engine's noise, while on older engines hush kits are used to help mitigate their excessive noise.

==== Engine location ====
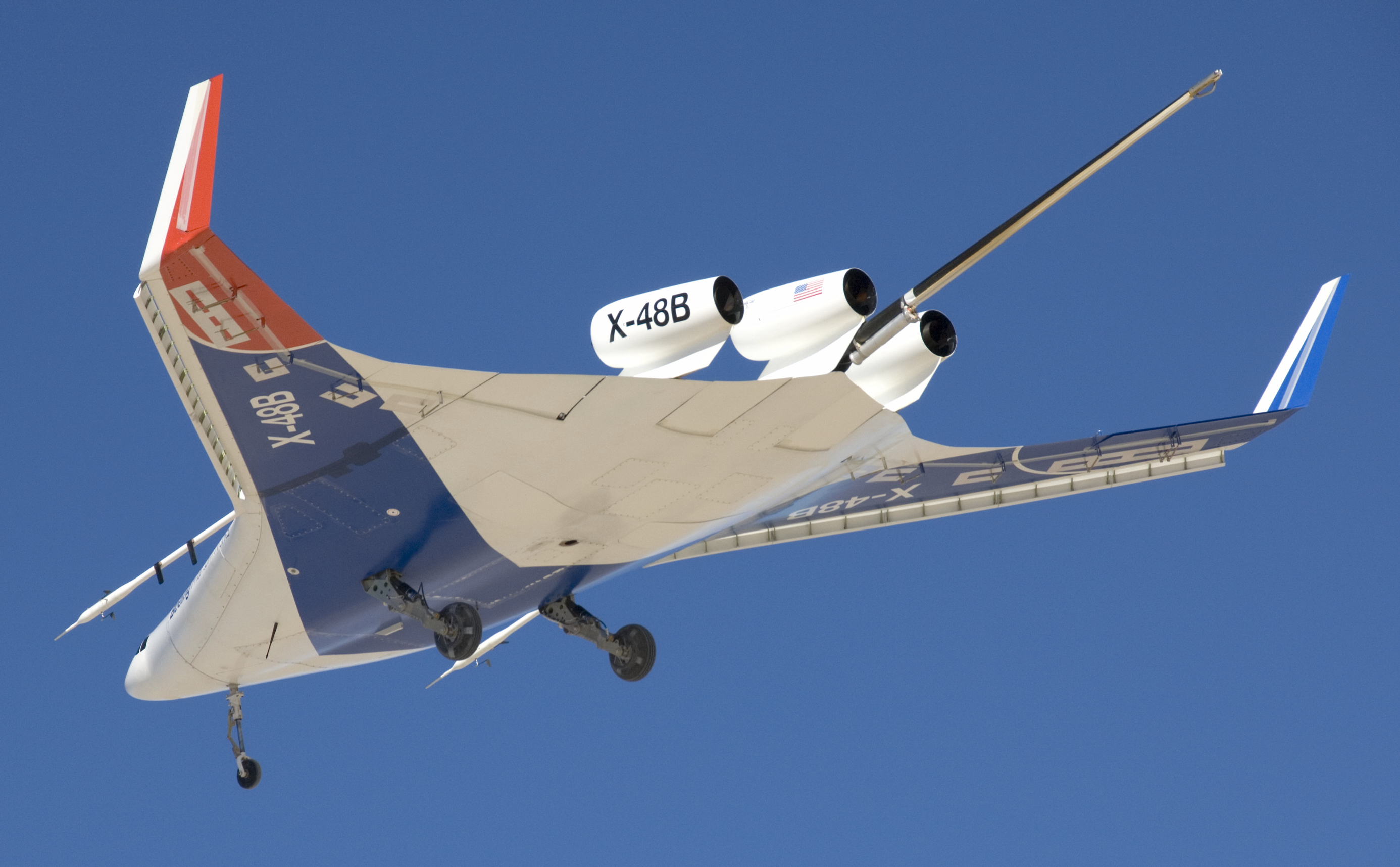
Turbofans mounted above the wing of a prototype Boeing X-48

The ability to reduce noise may be limited if engines remain below aircraft's wings. NASA expects a cumulative 20–30 dB below Stage 4 limits by 2026–2031, but keeping aircraft noise within airport boundaries requires at least a 40–50 dB reduction. Landing gear, wing slats and wing flaps also produce noise and may have to be shielded from the ground with new configurations. NASA found that over-wing and mid-fuselage nacelles could reduce noise by 30–40 dB to even 40–50 dB for hybrid wing bodies, which may be essential for open rotors.

By 2020, helicopter technologies in development plus new procedures could reduce noise levels by 10 dB and noise footprints by 50%, but more advances are needed to preserve or expand heliports. Package delivery UAS will need to characterize their noise, establish limits and reduce their impact.

==== Satellite-based navigation systems ====
Usage of satellite-based navigation systems can contribute to noise relief, trials in 2013–14 found, though results were not always beneficial due to concentrating flight paths. Changing flight angles and flight paths brought some changes in noise relief for some local people.

== See also ==
- Aviation taxation and subsidies – Taxes and subsidies related to aviation
- Electric airplane – Aircraft powered directly by electricity, with no other engine needed
- Farley v Skinner
- Hush kit – Device to reduce noise produced by aircraft jet engines
- Helicopter noise reduction – Reducing the noise caused by helicopters
- Jet noise – Noise caused by jets
- Noise barrier – Exterior structure on infrastructure used to prevent loud sounds from escaping
- Rotor-stator interaction
- Silent Aircraft Initiative – Study to reduce aircraft noise dramatically
- Toroidal propeller – Type of propeller design
- Train noise – Vehicle noise made by trains
- XF-84H Thunderscreech, the loudest aircraft ever built.

General:

- Health effects from noise – Health consequences of exposure to elevated sound levels
- Noise pollution – Excessive displeasing noise
- Noise regulation – Noise control by legal regulation of noise-producing items
- Aviation and the environment – Effect of emissions from aircraft engines
