= Hush kit =

Device to reduce noise produced by aircraft jet engines

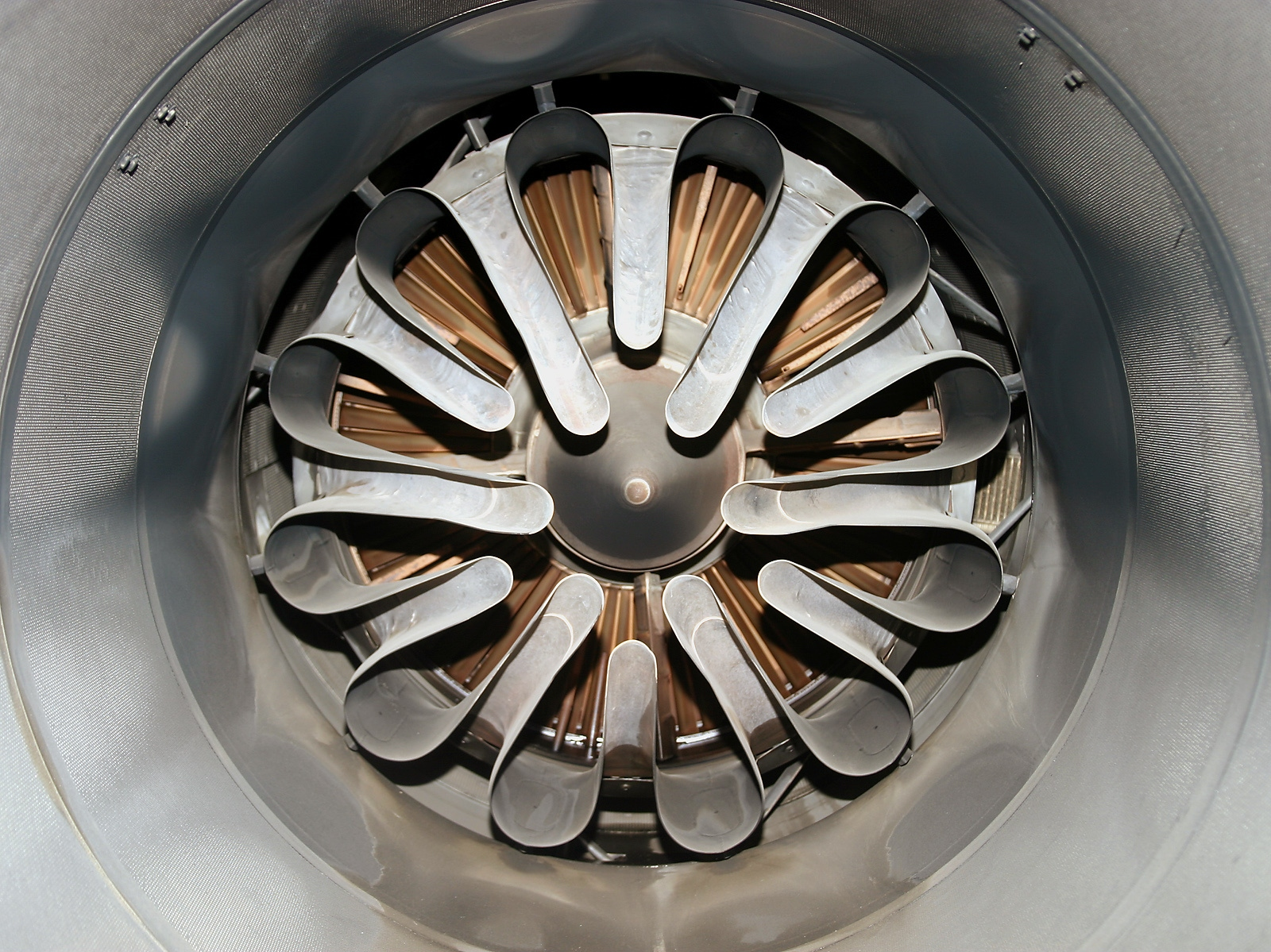
Hush kit for the Pratt and Whitney JT8D-1 through -17 engines

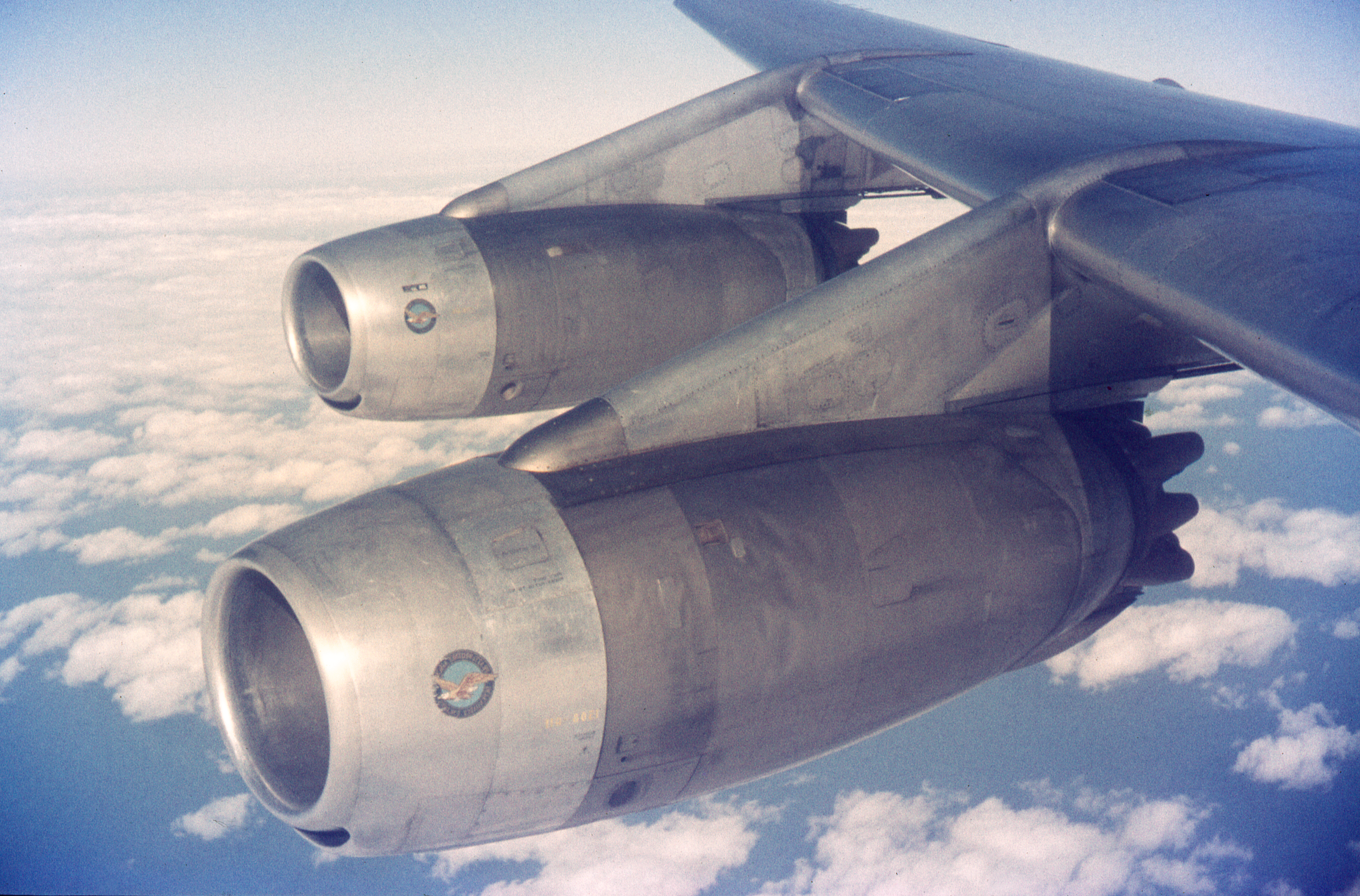
Two JT4As installed on a KLM DC-8

A hush kit is a retrofit modification used to reduce the noise produced by older aircraft jet engines. Hush kits are typically installed on older turbojet and low-bypass turbofan engines, as they are much louder than later high-bypass turbofan engines and often fail to meet modern limits for aircraft noise pollution.

== Design ==
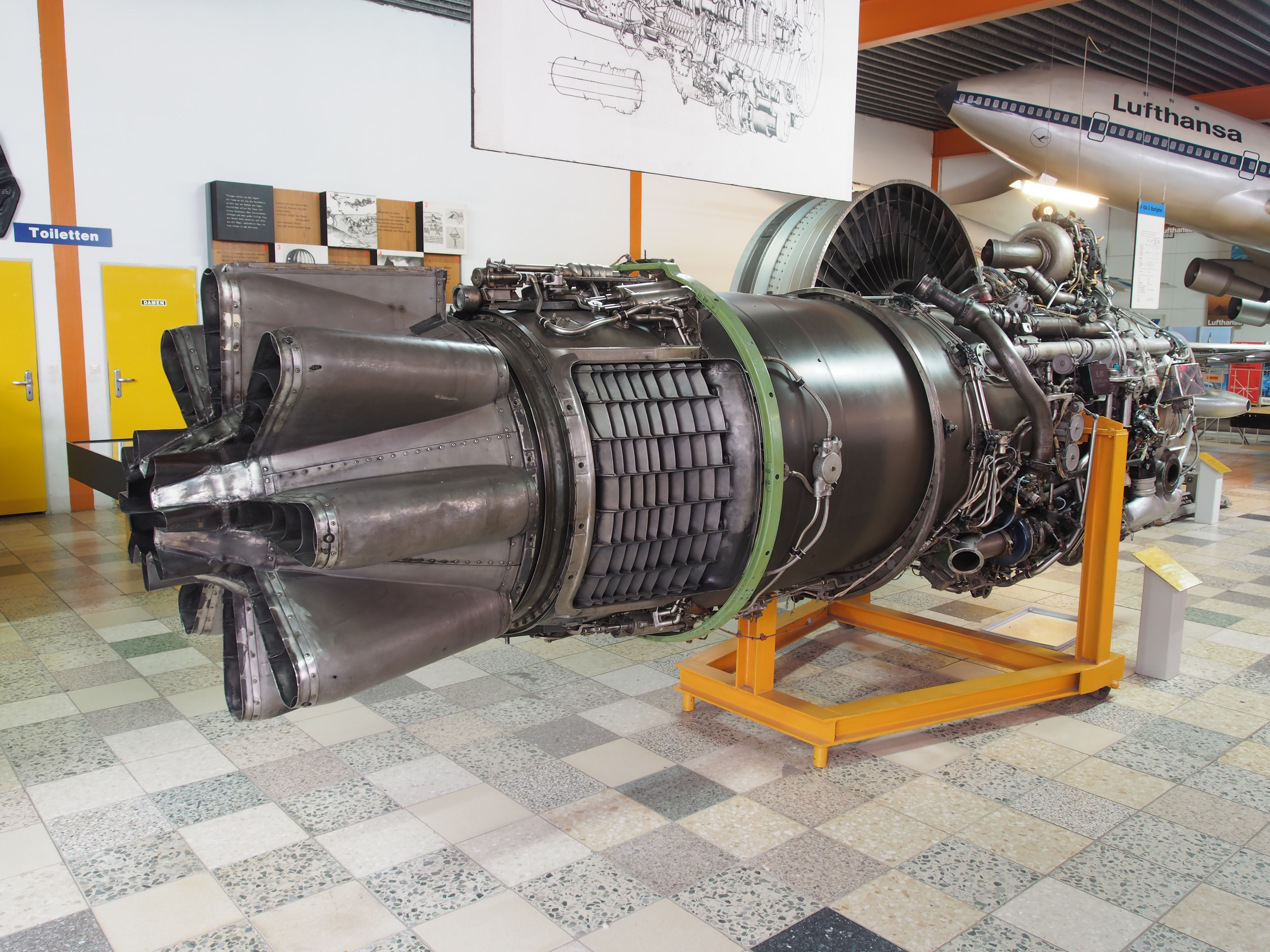
Rolls-Royce Conway Mk508 (1959) with hush kit attached

Hush kits must be designed specifically for each engine model, and their methods to reduce noise vary.

The most common form of hush kit is a multi-lobe exhaust mixer. This device is fitted to the rear of the engine and mixes the jet core's exhaust gases with the surrounding air and a small amount of available bypass air. Modern high-bypass turbofan engines build on this principle by utilizing available bypass air to envelop the jet-core exhaust at the rear of the engine, reducing noise.

Most hush kits make further modifications to the exhaust, including acoustically treated tailpipes, revised inlet nacelles and guide vanes. They reduce the forward propagating, high-pitched noise caused by the small, high-speed fan.

This kind of high-pitched noise is much less of an issue on modern high-bypass turbofan engines as the significantly larger front fans they employ are designed to spin at much lower speeds than those found in older turbojet and low-bypass turbofan engines.

== Use ==
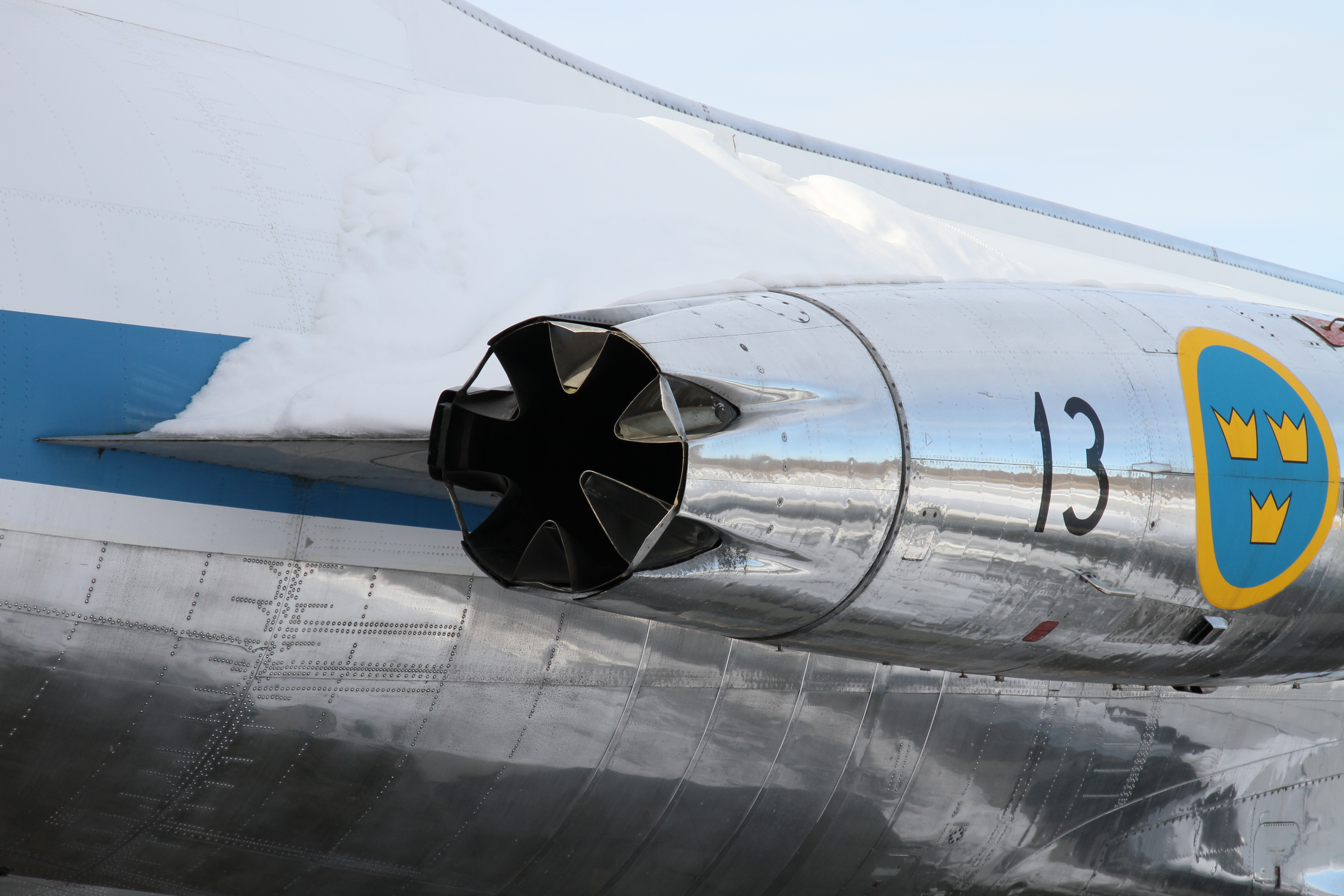
A hush kit installed on a Swedish Air Force Sud Aviation Caravelle

Modern aircraft equipped with mid and high-bypass turbofan engines are designed to comply with contemporary aviation noise abatement laws and ICAO regulations. Several older aircraft that are still in service (typically in a cargo capacity) have hush kits retrofitted so that they are able to conform with noise regulations needed to operate in many commercial airports. Some of the examples include:

- Boeing 707
- Boeing 727
- Boeing 737-100
- Boeing 737-200
- Douglas DC-8
- Douglas DC-9
- Gulfstream II
- Gulfstream III
- Learjet 23
- Learjet 24
- Learjet 25
- Learjet 28

== Impact ==
The impact of hush kits on noise level varies between each engine and retrofit device. For example, in recent measurements conducted by the German Aerospace Center (DLR), a hush kit and other modifications reduced the flyover noise of a specialized Airbus A320 by 3 dB, which the DLR claims to correspond to a perceived noise reduction of around 30 percent for people on the ground.

To illustrate the varying impact of hush kits on aircraft noise levels, the table below presents certified noise data before and after hush-kit installation for select aircraft types. These values are based on a 2012 FAA advisory circular and represent the Effective Perceived Noise Level in decibels (EPNdB) measured at takeoff.

Aircraft	Engine	Retrofit specification	MTOW (before) (1000 lb)	MTOW (after) (1000 lb)	Takeoff EPNdB (before)	Takeoff EPNdB (after)	ΔEPNdB
Boeing 737-200 ADV	Pratt & Whitney JT8D-9	LGW-N Hushkit	119.50	118.50	91.7	91.6	-0.1
Airbus A321-111	CFM International CFM56-5B1/P and/or 5B1/3	Mod. No 32871, 33987 (Enhanced acoustic thrust reverser, Core chevron nozzle)	196.21	196.21	88.8	83.8	-5.0
McDonnell Douglas MD-80	Pratt & Whitney JT8D-217A	AFS Quiet MD-80 HWS Noise Abatement System	160.00	149.50	92.0	87.1	-4.9
Grumman Gulfstream II	Rolls Royce Spey 511-8	QTA Stage 3 hushkit	62.00	62.00	90.9	84.3	-6.6

Hush kits can adversely affect the range and performance of the aircraft they are fitted to due to the added weight and the possible reduction of engine performance and aerodynamic efficiency by the modification. In 2003, the pilot of the first Gulfstream III fitted with a Quiet Technology Aerospace Stage 3 hush kit noted a 1.5-1.8% reduction in aircraft range over the baseline model.

== Regulation ==
While hush kits effectively reduce noise emissions from older aircraft, noise cannot always be reduced to the level of modern planes at a reasonable cost.

In 1999, this concern led to a regulatory dispute between the United States and the European Union, where the EU proposed a new noise ordinance which effectively prevented the use of hush kits in Europe. By December 31, 1999, all Stage 2 noise jetliners 75,000 pounds or more operating in the US must have Stage 3 hush kits in order to continue to fly in the US after January 1, 2000. This regulation threatened to reduce the value of the mostly-American used airplanes that employed hush kits and hurt the profits of American hush kit manufacturers. EU Regulation 925/99 was passed over US threats to ban Concorde but was superseded (and effectively repealed) by EU Directive No. 2002/30/EC issued March 26, 2002.

In 2013, the FAA modified 14 CFR part 91 rules to prohibit the operation of jets weighing 75,000 pounds or less that are not Stage 3 noise compliant after December 31, 2015. Any Stage 2 Business jets 75,000 pounds or below that have not been modified by installing Stage 3 noise compliant engines or have not had Stage 3 hush kits installed for non-compliant engines will not be permitted to fly in the contiguous 48 states after December 31, 2015. 14 CFR §91.883 Special flight authorizations for jet airplanes weighing 75,000 pounds or less – lists special flight authorizations that may be granted for operation after December 31, 2015.

== See also ==
- Aircraft noise pollution
- Chevron (aerospace)
- Winglets
- QTOL
- Stealth aircraft
