= Silent Aircraft Initiative =

Study to reduce aircraft noise dramatically

The Silent Aircraft Initiative was a study undertaken by the Cambridge-MIT Institute to discover ways to reduce aircraft noise dramatically, to the point where it would be virtually unnoticeable to people outside the airport perimeter.

== History ==
Launched in November 2003, the program had the support of Rolls-Royce, Boeing and Marshall Aerospace. The study has since been funded by the UK Treasury and industrial partners.

== Steeper descent ==
Part of the study was to examine if a steeper continuous descent into an airport would reduce approach noise levels. Theoretical analysis would be backed up by field trials using real jetliners.

== Hull and engine design ==
A major part of the study was to develop jetliner and engine designs that could meet the SAI objectives.

The favoured hull configuration was a blended wing design, with the engines located on the upper surface of the wing, to shield ground observers from the engine noise. Because the blended wing is too shallow to accommodate twin engines, a four-engine configuration was proposed.

The favoured engine configuration was a turbofan with very low specific thrust, i.e. very high ratio of bypass air. This gives a less effective exhaust gas velocity (lower jet noise) and therefore lower efficiency, and can be achieved in the landing phase by using a variable area final nozzle to rematch the fan. Furthermore, acoustic treatment in the intake and exhaust ducting can minimize turbomachinery noise.

== See also ==
- SAI Quiet Supersonic Transport, a silent business jet
- Toroidal propeller
