= Rotor–stator interaction =

An important issue for the aeronautical industry is the reduction of aircraft noise. The rotor–stator interaction is a predominant part of the noise emission. Presented are an introduction to these interaction theories, whose applications are numerous. For example, the conception of air-conditioning ventilators requires a full understanding of this interaction.

== Noise emission of a rotor–stator mechanism ==
A rotor wake induces on the downstream stator blades a fluctuating vane loading, which is directly linked to the noise emission.

Consider a B blades rotor (at a rotation speed of $\Omega$) and a V blades stator, in a unique rotor–stator configuration. The source frequencies are multiples of $B \Omega$, that is to say $mB \Omega$. For the moment there is no access to the source levels $F_{m}$. The noise frequencies are also $mB \Omega$, not depending on the number of blades of the stator. Nevertheless, this number V has a predominant role in the noise levels ($P_{m}$) and directivity, as it will be discussed later.

Example

For an airplane air-conditioning ventilator, reasonable data are :

$B=13$ and $\Omega = 12000$ rnd/min

The blade passing frequency is 2600 Hz, so it is only necessary to include the first two multiples (2600 Hz and 5200 Hz), because of the human ear high-sensibility limit. The frequencies m=1 and m=2 must be studied.

== Optimization of the number of blades ==
As the source levels can't be easily modified, it is necessary to focus on the interaction between those levels and the noise levels .

The transfer function ${{P_m } \over {F_m }}$ contains the following part :

$\sum\limits_{s = - \infty }^{s = + \infty } {e^{ - {{i(mB - sV)\pi } \over 2}} J_{mB - sV} } (mBM)$

Where M is the Mach number and $J_{mB - sV}$ the Bessel function of mB–sV order. The influence of the transfer function may be minimized by reducing the value of the Bessel function. To do so, the argument must be smaller than the order of the Bessel function.

Back to the example :

For m=1, with a Mach number M=0.3, the argument of the Bessel function is about 4. Avoiding mB-sV less than 4 is required. If V=10, then 13-1x10=3, so there will be a noisy mode. If V=19, the minimum of mB-sV is 6, and the noise emission will be limited.

Remark :

The case that is to be strictly avoided is when mB-sV can be nul, which causes the order of the Bessel function to be 0. As a consequence, care must be taken regarding B and V as prime numbers.

== Determination of source levels ==
The minimization of the transfer function ${{F_m } \over {P_m }}$ is a great step in the process of reducing the noise emission. Nevertheless, to be highly efficient, it is necessary to predict the source levels $F_{m}$. This will lead us to choose to minimize the Bessel functions for the most significant values of m. For example, if the source level for m=1 is very higher than for m=2, no consideration are taken for the Bessel functions of order 2B-sV. The determination of the source levels is given by the Sears theory, which will not be explicated here.

== Directivity ==
All this study was made for a privileged direction : the axis of the rotor–stator. All the results are acceptable when the noise reduction is ought to be in this direction. In the case where the noise to reduce is perpendicular to the axis, the results are very different, as those figures shown :

For B=13 and V=13, which is the worst case, the sound level is very high on the axis (for $\theta = 0$)

For B=13 and V=19, the sound level is very low on the axis but high perpendicularly to the axis (for $\theta = Pi/2$)

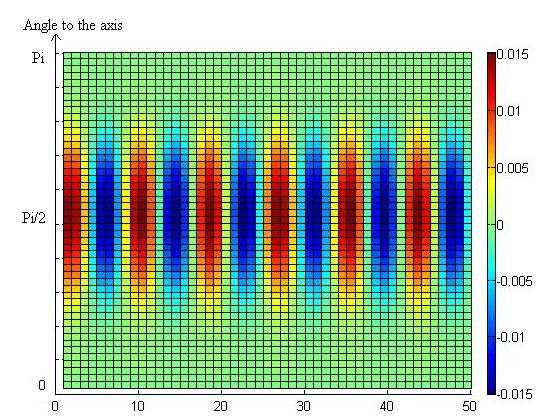
