= Exhaust mixer =

Turbofan engine component

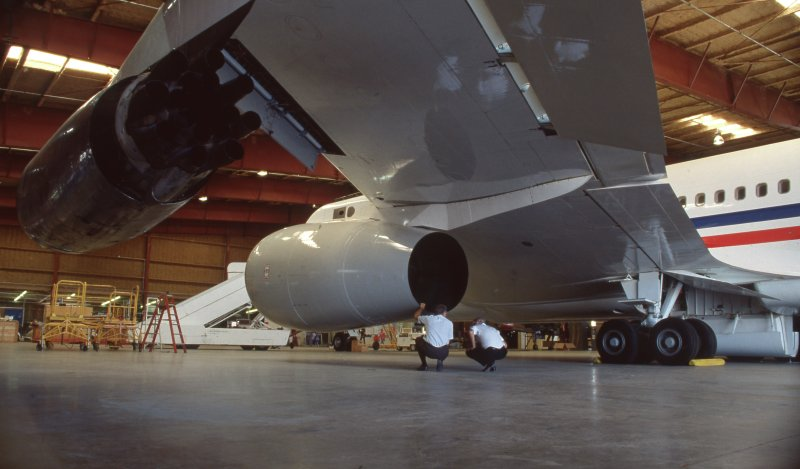
Pratt & Whitney JT4A turbojet with hush kit mixer and CFMi CFM56-5C turbofan with mixed exhaust under a GE Aerospace's Boeing 707 testbed.

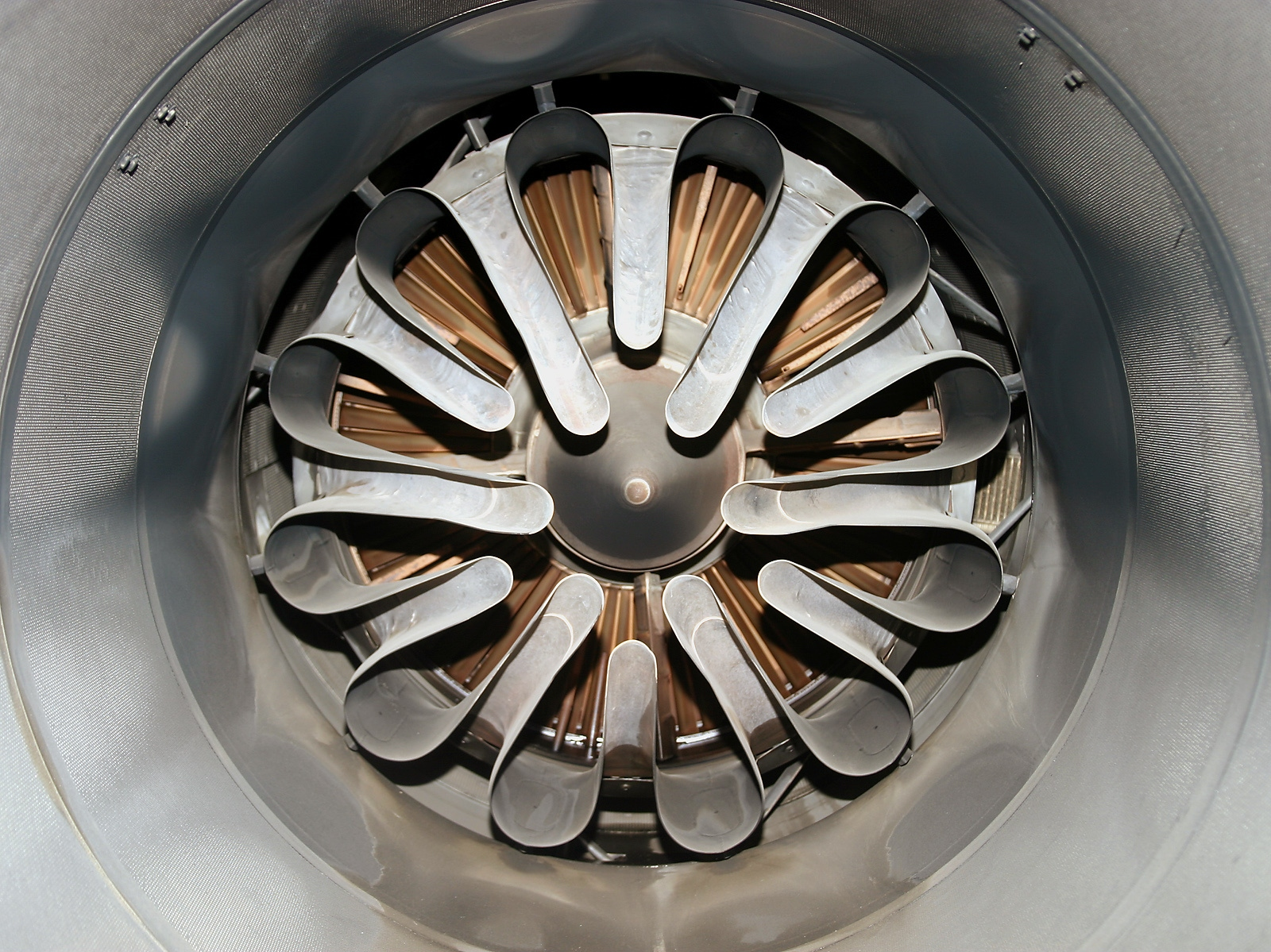
Exhaust mixer of a JT8D engine of a Boeing 737-200

In aviation, an exhaust mixer or flow mixer is a feature of many turbofan engines, where slower, colder bypass air is mixed with faster, hotter core exhaust gases, before exhausting to atmospheric pressure through a common (mixed flow) propelling nozzle.

== Benefits ==
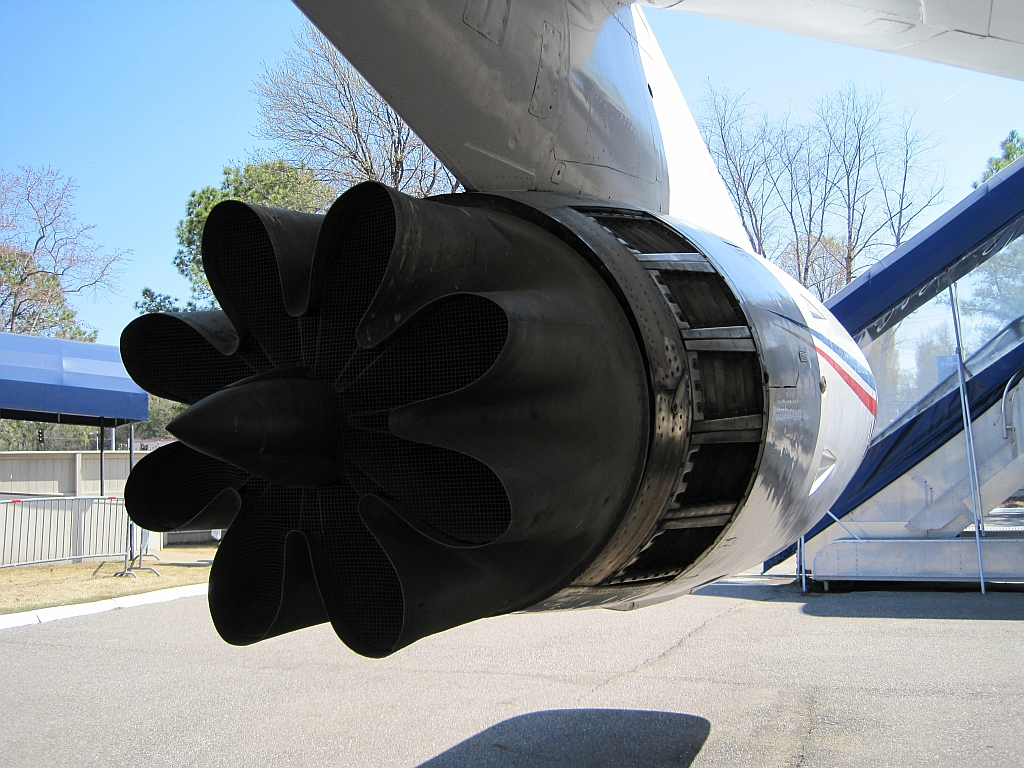
Hush kit mixer on the turbojet General Electric CJ805 of a Convair 880

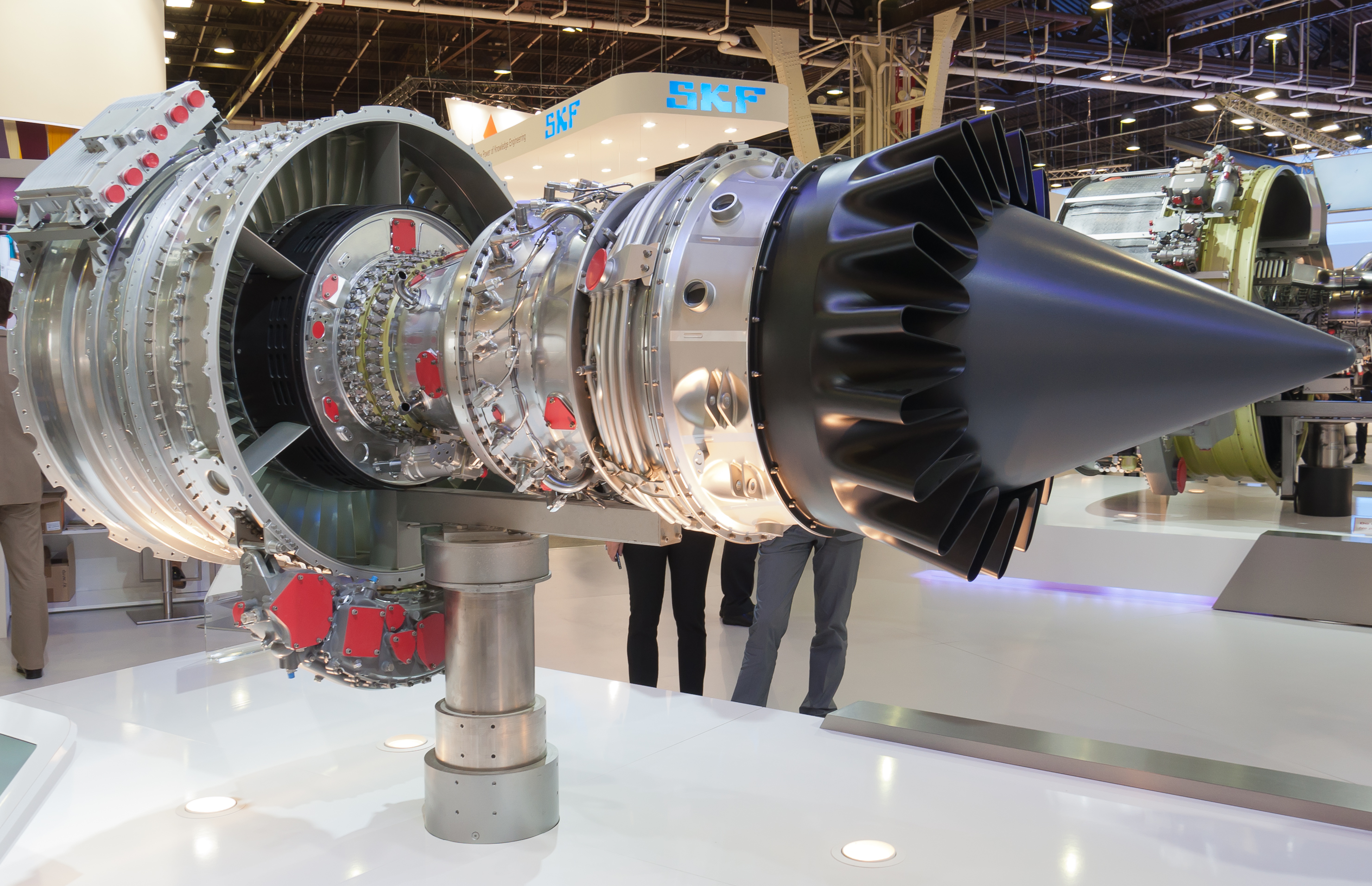
Exhaust mixer on a mockup of a Safran Silvercrest high-bypass turbofan used on large business jets

The mixer reduces the velocity of the core exiting air, and consequently, reducing the amount of noise produced. Additionally, the temperature of the exhaust is reduced, contributing to the overall reduction of the thermal signature of the aircraft. This attribute is critical in military aircraft where thermal detection or heat-seeking weapons are used, in particular stealth aircraft.

Ideally, a mixer is also a performance benefit to increasing thrust. The exhaust thrust from a jet engine is equal to exhaust mass flow times exhaust velocity, i.e., Thrust = ṁv, while the energy to make that thrust is given by Energy = 1/2mv^{2}. A mixer helps reduce the fastest exhaust velocities from the core of the engine, while making the average exhaust velocity faster, producing more thrust with the same energy.

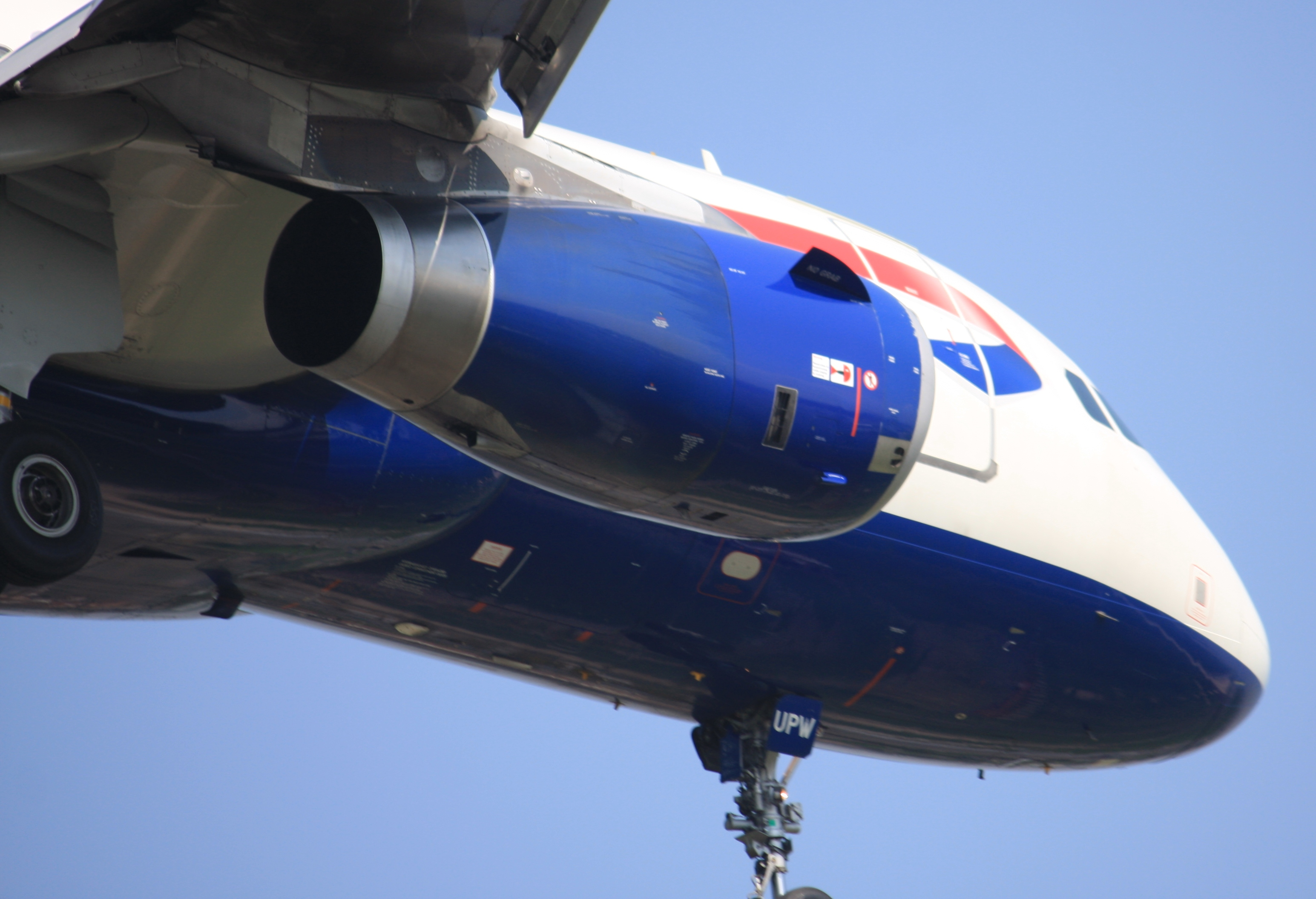
The IAE V2500 on the A320 family, using a mixed exhaust

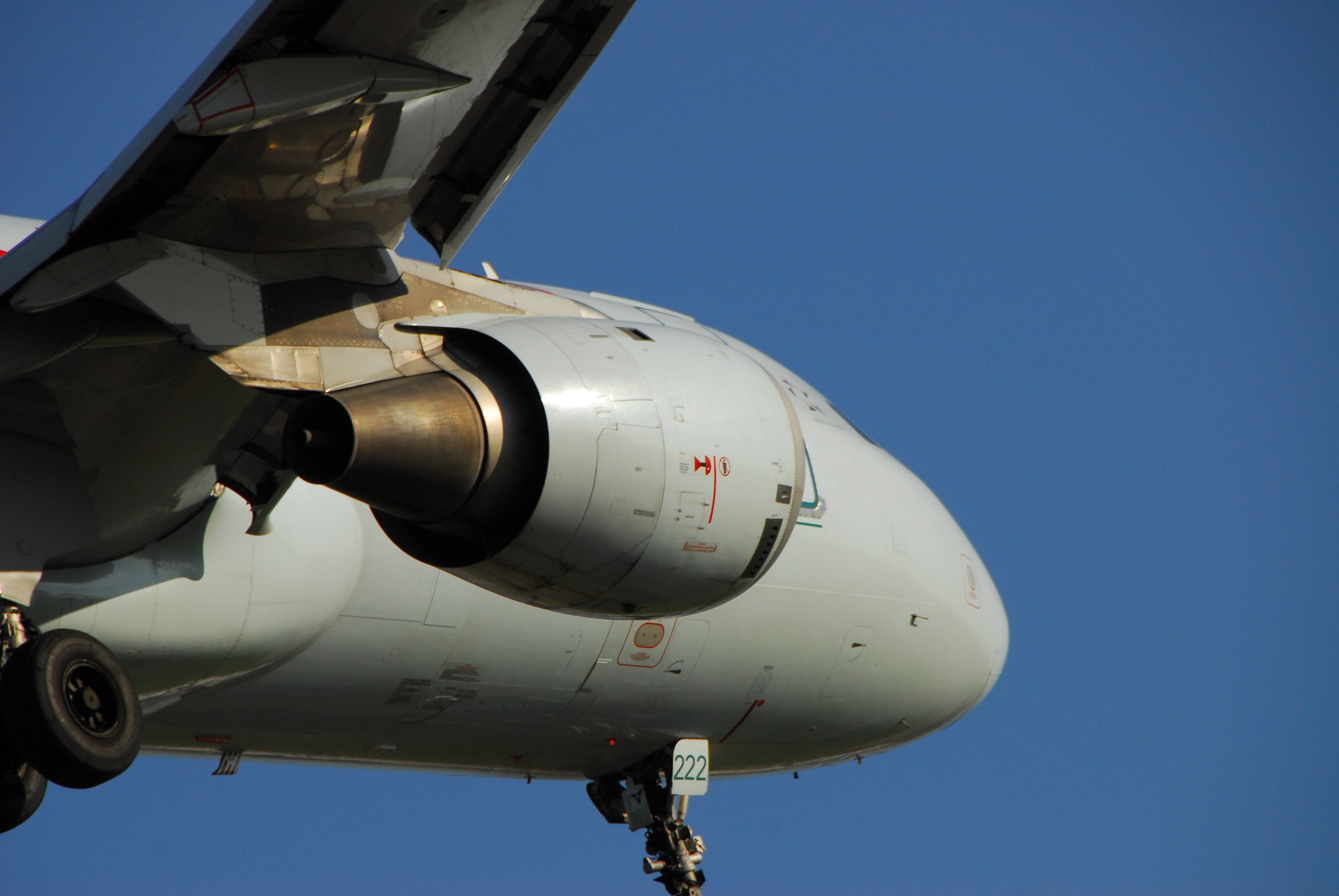
The CFM56-5A/B also powers the A320 family, but utilizing a separate exhaust nozzle

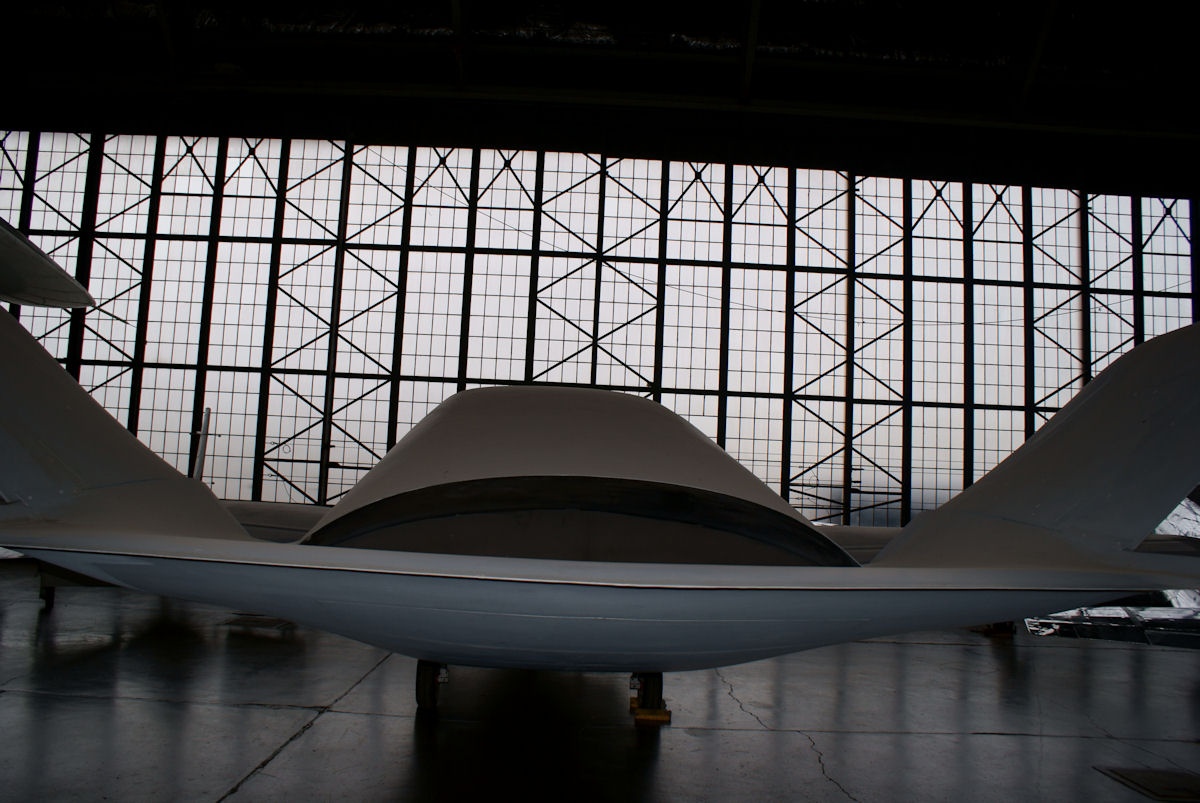
Slit shaped tail exhaust Northrop Tacit Blue

== Mixer types ==
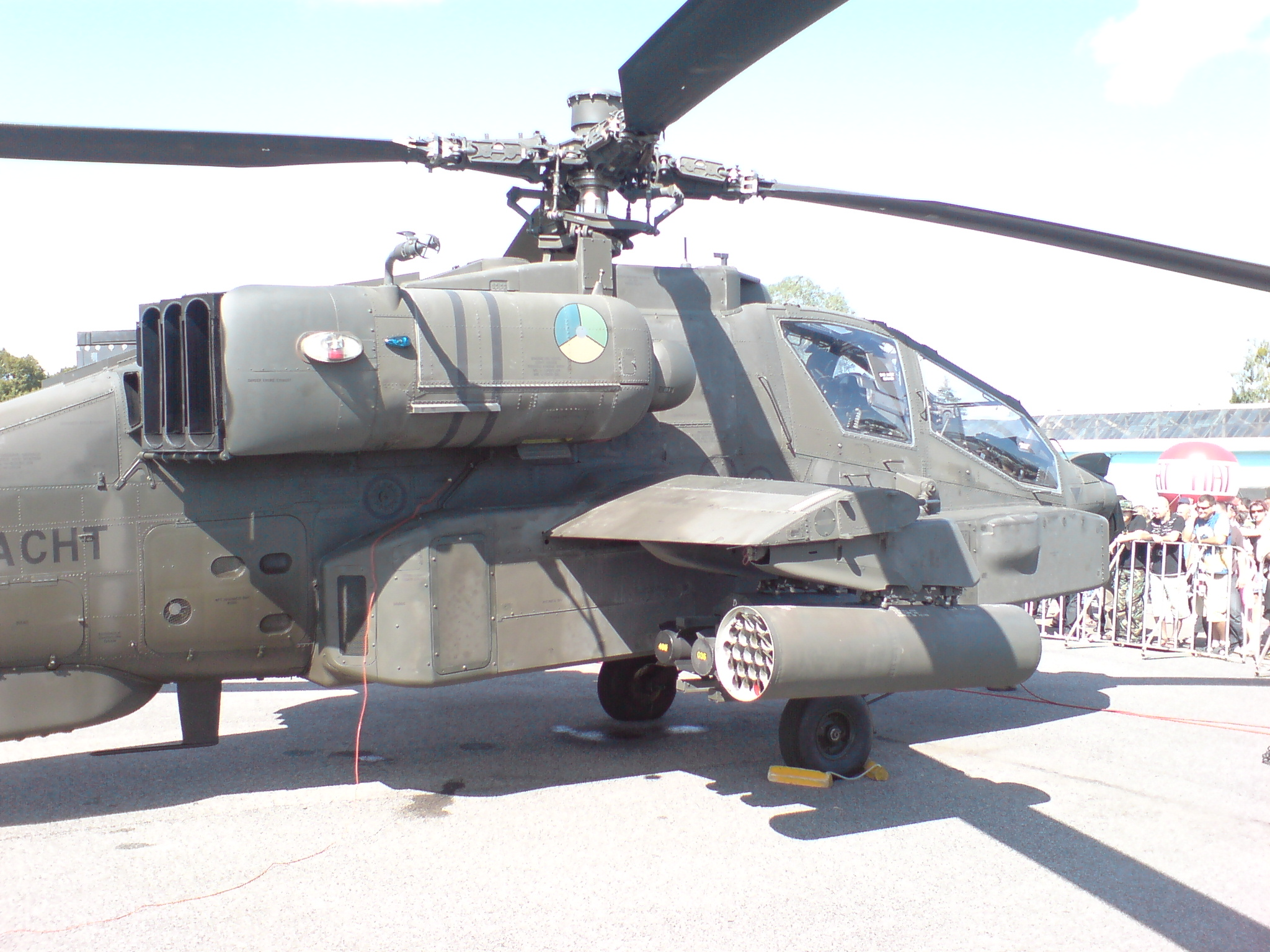
Apache AH-64 helicopter, with exhaust mixer to reduce IR signal

- Annular - bypass and core streams are brought together co-annularly, mixing being achieved by the shearing effect at the stream interface
- Forced - hot and cold chutes, intertwined, force the two streams to mix

Mixing efficiency is defined in a number of ways, but simply, compares the actual thrust gain (due to mixing) to that of the ideal case. Annular mixers have a low pressure loss, but a low mixing efficiency. Forced mixers can have a high mixing efficiency, but this is offset by a high pressure loss.

Mixers are extremely common on military turbofans, since long coaxial exhaust pipes (i.e. hot and cold) are avoided. Afterburning, with the associated variable area nozzle, is also easier to accommodate.

Some high bypass ratio (e.g. civil) turbofans now feature a mixer, the advantage being a small thrust gain, which improves specific fuel consumption. Although the mixing process is not thorough, there is a jet noise benefit as well.

== See also ==
- Infrared countermeasure
- Chevron (aeronautics)
- Hush kit
- QTOL
