= Continuous descent approach =

Aircraft approach method

Schematic descent profile of a conventional approach (red) and a continuous descent approach (green).

Continuous descent approach (CDA), also known as optimized profile descent (OPD), is a method by which aircraft approach airports prior to landing. CDAs avoid long segments of flight at a level altitude by allowing aircraft to descend continuously at a constant angle. It is designed to reduce fuel consumption and noise pollution compared to other conventional descents.

A continuous descent approach starts from the top of descent, i.e., at cruise altitude, and allows the aircraft to fly its optimal vertical profile down to runway threshold. Some airports apply constraints to this individual optimal profile.

== United Kingdom ==
CDAs were first used at London airports, including Heathrow and Gatwick in the early 2000s.

== See also ==
- List of aviation, avionics, aerospace and aeronautical abbreviations
- Index of aviation articles
- QTOL
- Nap-of-the-earth
