= Toroid =

Surface of revolution with a hole in the middle

A toroid using a square.

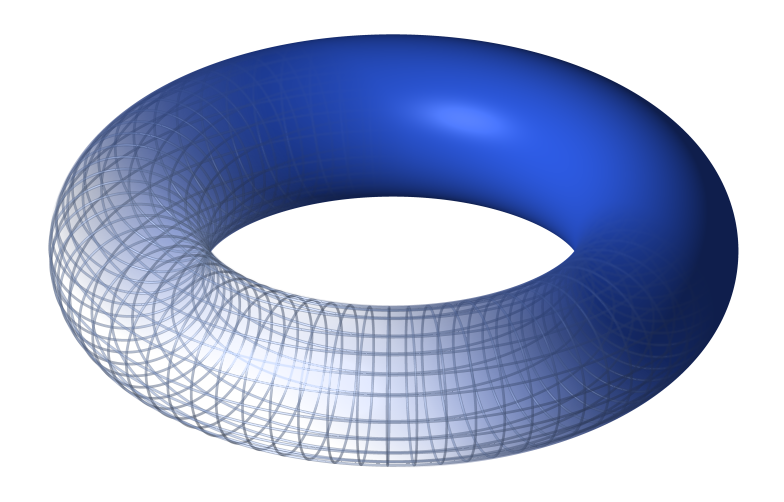
A torus is a type of toroid.

In mathematics, a toroid is a surface of revolution with a hole in the middle. The axis of revolution passes through the hole and so does not intersect the surface. For example, when a rectangle is rotated around an axis parallel to one of its edges, then a hollow rectangle-section ring is produced. If the revolved figure is a circle, then the object is called a torus.

The term toroid is also used to describe a toroidal polyhedron. In this context a toroid need not be circular and may have any number of holes. A g-holed toroid can be seen as approximating the surface of a torus having a topological genus, g, of 1 or greater. The Euler characteristic χ of a g holed toroid is 2(1−g).

The torus is an example of a toroid, which is the surface of a doughnut. Doughnuts are an example of a solid torus created by rotating a disk, and are not toroids.

Toroidal structures occur in both natural and synthetic materials.

== Equations ==
A toroid is specified by the radius of revolution R measured from the center of the section rotated. For symmetrical sections volume and surface of the body may be computed (with circumference C and area A of the section):

=== Square toroid ===
The volume (V) and surface area (S) of a toroid are given by the following equations, where A is the area of the square section of side, and R is the radius of revolution.

$$V = 2 \pi R A$$
$$S = 2 \pi R C$$

=== Circular toroid ===
The volume (V) and surface area (S) of a toroid are given by the following equations, where r is the radius of the circular section, and R is the radius of the overall shape.

$$V = 2  \pi^2 r^2 R$$
$$S = 4 \pi^2 r R$$

Pappus's centroid theorem generalizes the formulas here to arbitrary surfaces of revolution.

== See also ==
- Annulus
- Helix
- Solenoid
- Tokamak
- Toroidal inductors and transformers
- Toroidal propeller
