= Toroidal propeller =

Type of propeller design

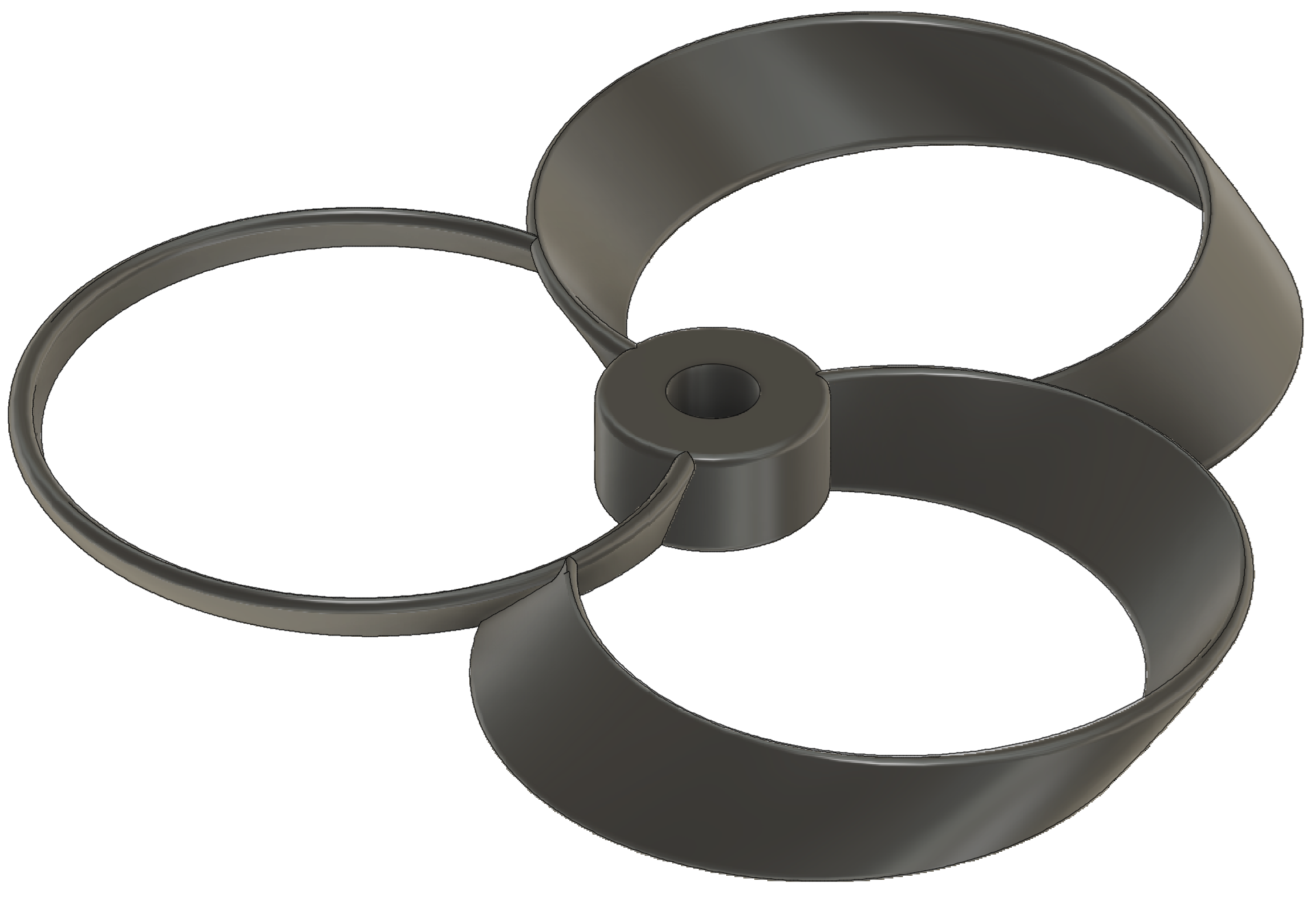
A simple three-blade toroidal propeller

A toroidal propeller is a type of propeller that is ring-shaped with each blade forming a closed loop. The propellers are significantly quieter at audible frequency ranges, between 20 Hz and 20 kHz, while generating thrust comparable to that of traditional propellers. In practice, toroidal propellers reduce noise pollution in both aviation and maritime transport.

== History ==
In the centuries after Archimedes invented the Archimedes' screw, developments of propeller design led to the torus marine propeller, then described as a propeller featuring "double blades". It was invented in the early 1890s by Charles Myers from Manchester affiliated with Fawcett, Preston and Company. The design was successfully trialed on several English steam tugboats and passenger ferries at the time.

In the 1930s, Friedrich Honerkamp patented a toroidal fan, and Rene Louis Marlet patented a toroidal aircraft propeller. The marine propeller was patented again in the late 1960s by Australian engineer David B. Sugden affiliated with Robbins Company of Seattle. Overall, the relevant Cooperative Patent Classification category, B63H1/265 Blades each blade being constituted by a surface enclosing an empty space, e.g. forming a closed loop, features over 160 patents in 120 years worldwide as of 2024.

The technology was adapted for fluid dynamics in the 2010s by Gregory Sharrow with twisted loops instead of traditional blades. He patented propellers that addressed issues with rotary propulsion through the reduction of tip cavitation and vortices to increase performance in boats. Sharrow Marine argued that the benefits of lower fuel consumption, higher efficiency and reduced noise are even greater in water. Its MX propeller was recognized as one of Time magazine's "Best Inventions of 2023" for being more efficient and quieter than standard boat propellers.

== Design and features ==
The design distributes vortices generated by the propeller along the entire shape of the propeller, which means that noise is distributed and damped more quickly without requiring components that add weight to increase overall power. It has similarities with the closed wing, which is annularly shaped and therefore distributes the vortices generated along the entire shape instead of just at the tip. This decreases the probability that the spinning propeller will catch onto objects or cut surfaces.

Drone propellers made according to this principle have been shown to emit a frequency between 1 and 5 Hz, which is outside the audible spectrum for humans.

== In use ==
Toroidal propellers are most commonly used by the aviation and maritime industries. On drones they are used with thrusts comparable to multirotor drone propellers, and on boats with a notable increase in efficiency. Due to their low noise production, the propellers have also been associated with quiet take off and landing protocols and stealth aircraft. Unmanned aerial vehicles such as Amazon Prime Air, valkyrie drones, collision-tolerant drones and cargo drones have also been considered for use.
