= QTOL =

Aircraft takeoff and landing done quietly

Quiet take off and landing is a concept originating with the new generation of advanced technology engines which emit a reduction of noise levels compared to conventional turbojet and turbofan engines. Most of the main aircraft industries are developing these types of engines while the airframe manufacturers also have various new designs intended to use advanced technology engines. Apart from adapting the new engines with their twin/triple spools, methods of reducing noise include installing variable pitch fan blades to existing engine designs.

Examples of this have previously been undertaken by the firm Dowty Rotol, who by changing the position of the engine, sometimes to above the wing, as on the VFW-Fokker 614, or even back into the wing as on a number of older designs such as the De Havilland Comet and V bombers.

== See also ==
- Continuous descent approach
- Stealth aircraft
- Cloaking device
