= WELL Building Standard =

Standard for well-being building design

WELL Building Standard (WELL) is a healthy building certification program, developed by the International WELL Building Institute PCB (IWBI), a California registered public benefit corporation.

== History ==
The WELL Building Standard was launched in 2014 by Paul Scialla of Delos company, becoming the first well-being focused standard. By 2016, over 200 projects in 21 countries adopted the certification. In 2014, Green Business Certification Inc. began to provide third-party certification for WELL. By 2024, WELL says that it is being used across more than 5 billion square feet of space in 130 countries, supporting an estimated 25 million occupants in nearly 74,000 commercial and residential locations.

== Performance ==
Scientific research provides information about the standard's performance. Existing research focuses on the evaluation of indoor environmental quality (IEQ) parameters. The certification requires post-occupancy evaluation, which allows occupants to provide feedback to building owners and management on these IEQ parameters. For buildings with 10 or more occupants, the Occupant Indoor Environmental Quality (IEQ) Survey from the Center for the Built Environment at UC Berkeley (or an approved alternative) is completed by a representative sample of at least 30% of occupants at least once per year. The survey covers the following topics: acoustics, thermal comfort, furnishings, workspace light levels and quality, odors and air quality, cleanliness and maintenance, and layout.

In 2020, researchers analyzed 1,121 post-occupancy evaluation surveys conducted in nine offices, two WELL-certified and seven not WELL-certified. Results of the study were mixed, with higher occupant satisfaction in the WELL-certified buildings for spatial comfort, thermal comfort, noise and privacy, personal control, and workspace comfort, but lower satisfaction for visual comfort and connection to the outside in comparison with non-WELL certified buildings. These findings may be attributable to the types of non-WELL certified buildings used in the comparison, as they may already be high-performance buildings in other regards which do not necessarily satisfy all of the WELL certification's criteria.

In 2021, another study on surveys compared the results of three rounds of occupant IEQ satisfaction surveys reported by three groups of employees who moved from three non-WELL (two BREEAM and one non-certified) to three WELL-certified office buildings. For two out of the three building pairs, there was a statistically significant increase in building and workspace satisfaction after relocation to WELL buildings. However, for 55% of certification parameters for the three compared cases, there was an insignificant difference upon relocation. Results found higher occupant satisfaction for building cleanliness and furniture but no increase in satisfaction with noise and visual comfort.

Another 2021 study investigated indoor air quality (IAQ) before and after relocation to WELL-certified office buildings. The results indicated there was no significant concentration difference for the majority of measured air pollutants between non-WELL and WELL buildings.

In 2022, researchers conducted a pre- versus post-occupancy evaluation of approximately 1,300 workers transitioning to WELL-certified offices from non-WELL certified offices. Using pre- and post-occupancy surveys, overall satisfaction rates improved from 42% (pre-occupancy) to 70% (post-occupancy) across all parameters. The largest increases in satisfaction were for cleanliness and access to nature, while occupants were most satisfied with maintenance and lighting in WELL-certified offices.

In 2023, researchers analyzed 1,403 post-occupancy evaluation surveys from 14 open-plan offices (10 of which were WELL-certified and four of which were uncertified) in Australia, New Zealand, and Hong Kong. The five offices that achieved the highest satisfaction in interior design, indoor air quality, privacy and connection to the outdoor environment were WELL-certified. No significant differences in health were found between WELL-certified and non-WELL certified buildings as quantified by questions about physical and mental health presented in the post-occupancy evaluation surveys.

In 2024, researchers used a statistical matching approach to compare occupant satisfaction from 3,268 surveys from 20 WELL-certified and 49 LEED-certified buildings. Overall building and workplace satisfaction was found to be high in WELL-certified buildings (94% and 87%). Statistical analysis revealed that there is a 39% higher probability of finding an occupant that is satisfied with the building overall in a WELL-certified building than a LEED-certified building. Although satisfaction was found to be higher in WELL-certified buildings, satisfaction in LEED-certified buildings with the building, workspace, and most IEQ parameters was still relatively high. Temperature and sound privacy in LEED-certified buildings are the only parameters with mean satisfaction values less than "neutral" amongst all studied parameters in LEED- and WELL-certified buildings.

== Principles & concepts ==
WELL v2 met best practices on four tenets: evidence-based, verifiable, implementable, and feedback-focused. The principles in WELL v2 are equitable, global, evidence-based, technically robust, customer-focused, and resilient. WELL is a performance-based system which Performance Verification is completed by an authorized WELL Performance Testing Agent.

== Certification ==
There are two types of certifications, the WELL Certification for Owner-occupied and the WELL Core Certification. The WELL Core is for the building that provide tenant occupation more than 75%, and not needed to achieve minimum points from every subjects.

The WELL Silver, Gold, and Platinum level must achieve at least 1, 2, and 3 points per subject, but the WELL Bronze has no minimum points' rule. For WELL core, there are no minimum point.

The optimization point requirement from the WELL Bronze, Silver, Gold, and Platinum are ranging from 40, 50, 60, and 80 points. The rating system limits 12 points per subject, except the Innovation which limit under 10 points. Total points must not be over 100.

== Assessment ==
The WELL certificated buildings must pass all precondition requirements and they could get optimization points available from extension subjects.

Assessment Area	Preconditions	Optimization Points
Air	indoor air quality, smoke-free environment, adequate ventilation design, construction pollution management	18
Water	water quality indicator, drinking water quality, water quality monitoring and legionella management	14
Nourishment	availability and visibility of fruit and vegetable	16
Light	light exposure by daylight or circadian lighting, provide visual comfort and enhance visual acuity	18
Movement	facilitate exercise, ergonomic design workstation	21
Thermal Comfort	acceptable thermal environment	16
Sound	acoustic design plan and label of acoustic zones	18
Material	restriction, management and addressing of hazardous material such as Chromated copper arsenate, asbestos, mercury, polychlorinated biphenyl and lead	18
Mind	provide mental health support, integrate local nature art and culture	19
Community	communication of WELL feature to users, integrative design by stakeholders, emergency management, occupant surveys	43
Innovation	-	28
Total Points		229

== Air ==
Because users spend 90% time in interior, they can expose to indoor air pollutions that lead to headaches, dry throat, eye irritation, runny nose, asthma attacks, infection with legionella bacteria and carbon monoxide poisoning. It leads to thousands of cancer death and 100,000 of respiratory issues annually. Avoidable costs in the U.S. could be over 100 billion dollars annually 45% from radon and tobacco and 45% from lost productivity, and 10% respiratory diseases. Combustion sources such as candles, tobacco, stoves, furnaces, fireplaces producing carbon monoxide, nitrogen dioxide, and small particles are common. Furnishings, fabrics, cleaning product emit volatile organic compound (VOCs). It could be resolved by eliminate problem sources and design solutions. Air pollution leads to 7 millions premature deaths, around 600,000 of those were children under 5 years old in 2012.

=== A01-A04 Precondition ===
A01 Air Quality topic, the WELL conducts to limit level of particulate matter both PM2.5 and PM10 under 15 and 50 for normal region or 25 and 50 microgram/cubic metre or 30% of 24–48 hours average of outdoor levels for polluted region and thresholds for volatile organic compound (VOC) such as benzene, formaldehyde, toluene to 10, 50, and 300 microgram/cubic metre or total VOC of 500 microgram/cubic metre. Inorganic gases such as carbon monoxide and ozone are also limited to 10 milligram per cubic metre and 100 microgram/cubic metre. Radon is limited under 0.15 Becquerel/Litre. WELL makes sure that all air quality shall be monitored with a digital platform, except for radon parameter.

A02 Smoke-free Environment topic, smoking and using of electronic cigarette indoor is not allowed, except for outdoors at only ground level further than 7.5 m from project apertures including air-intake area.

A03 Ventilation Design topic, the WELL assured building to have existing or new mechanical ventilation systems following ASHRAE 62.1-2 or EN standard 16798-1 or AS 1668.2 or CIBSE Guide A: Environmental Design. Naturally ventilation can also be used without mechanical ventilation system if the design follows Natural Ventilation Procedure in ASHRAE 62.1, CIBSE AM10, AS 1668.4 at least 90% of the project area. Ventilation monitoring can be only solution if carbon dioxide level is met under 900 ppm indoor and 500 ppm outdoor.

A04 Construction Pollution Management topic, the contractor is to ensure that ducts are cleaned and protected from contamination. Contractor shall filter with more than 70% efficiency for particles 3-10 micrometers on the installed ventilation system during construction. Contractor must implement dust and moisture management such as using of temporary barriers, dust guards for saws, walk-off mats on entryway.

=== A05 - A14 Optimization ===
A05 Enhanced Air Quality topic, enhancing threshold of particulate matter both PM2.5 and PM10 under 12 and 30 for 1 point, 10 and 20 for 2 points. Enhancing volatile organic compound such as benzene, formaldehyde, toluene under 3, 9, 300 microgram/cubic metre and additional acetaldehyde, acrylonitrile, caprolactam, naphthalene under 140, 5, 2.2, 9 microgram/cubic metre would receive 1 point. Inorganic gases such as carbon monoxide and nitrogen dioxide under 7 milligram per cubic metre and 40 microgram per cubic metre receives additional 1 point.

A06 Enhanced Ventilation Design topic threshold of mechanical and natural ventilation or with demand controlled ventilation (DCV) or engineered natural ventilation system to keep CO_{2} levels low, or at least 50% of workstations are supplied in the breathing zone with an airspeed under 50 fpm at user's head receives 2 points. Displacement ventilation system implement or air diffusers located 2.8 m above the floor receives additional 1 points.

A07 Operable Windows, providing openable windows to access to outdoor air, available to access outdoor air by 75% of regularly occupied areas or 4% of the occupied areas of there are many floors receives 1 point, another 1 point, if there is outdoor air quality for PM2.5, temperature, relative humidity display near windows.

A08 Air quality monitoring and Awareness topic, installing air quality sensor and submitting data to WELL provides 1 point and display screens available in the building to promote awareness provides another 1 point.

A09 Pollution Infiltration Management topic, entrance way design such as 3 meters' air door and to slow movement of air from outdoor to indoor by building vestibule or revolving doors, air curtain and management by wet cleaning once a week, vacuuming once a day provides 1 point and envelope of building that is designed to mitigate outside air pollution provides another 1 point.

A10 Combustion Minimization topic, combustion restriction indoor or keeping away from building 3.3 meter and vehicle running limitation of 30 seconds.

A11 Source Separation topic by to remove the sources by design separately closed door, negatively pressurized or exhaust fans such as the return air to outdoor of all bathrooms, kitchens, cleaning and chemical storage, high-volume printers and copiers provides 1 point.

A12 Air Filtration topic by using media filters in ventilation system or standalone device by appropriate efficiency to filter outdoor air, the higher PM2.5, the higher efficiency from 35% to 95% and keep replacing annually provides 1 point.

A13 Enhanced Supply Air topic by ventilating occupied spaces with all outdoor air or cleaning devices such as activated carbon filter with efficiency of 75% or media filter or Ultraviolet germicidal irradiation (UVGI) under UL 2998 Zero Ozone Emissions Validation or Intertek Zero Ozone Verification provides 1 point.

A14 Microbe and Mold Control topic by implement ultraviolet radiation system for HVAC coil each provides 1 point.

== Water ==
WELL Water aims to increase the rate of adequate hydration in building and reduce risks due to contaminated water. Human's body is two-thirds water, recommended water intake around 2 - 3.7 litres per day to let respiration, perspiration and excretion works. Water with high nitrate can impair oxygen transport in infants, causing neurodevelopment impair. Trihalomethane (THMs) and haloacetic acids (HAAs) in water can cause cancer. Legionella control is needed in cooling systems and hot tubs. Materials must not support mold growth. Well bathroom design, better hand washing leads to reduce risks enteric and respiratory diseases.

=== W01 - W03 Precondition ===
For W01 Water Quality Indicators, WELL conducts by performance test to limit turbidity of water under 1.0 Nephelometric Turbidity Unit (NTU) or Formazin Turbidity Unit (FTU) or Formazin Nephelometric Units (FNU). Water sample of any 100 ml shall have zero coliform bacteria.

For W02 Drinking Water Quality, the project requires drinking water that limits chemical contamination of arsenic, cadmium, chromium, copper, fluoride, lead, mercury, nickel, nitrate, nitrite, chlorine, trihalomethane, and haloacetic acids. Pesticide contamination has to be controlled such as aldrin and dieldrin, atrazine, carbofuran, chlordane, 2,4-Dichlorophenoxyacetic acid, DDT, lindane, pentachlorophenol. Organic contaminants are also limit, such as benzene, benzo(a)pyrene, carbon tetrachloride, 1,2-Dichloroethane, tetrachloroethene, toluene, trichloroethylene, 2,4,6-Tribromophenol, vinyl chloride, and xylene.

For W03, Basic Water Management, annually monitoring is required such as turbidity, pH, residual free chlorine. Legionella management must be determined in the building.

=== W04 - W08 Optimization ===
For W04, Enhanced Water Quality, enhancing threshold of drinking water contamination level provides 1 point.

W05, Drinking Water Quality Management provides total 3 points. For 2 points, the project needs pre-testing water quality on the farthest water dispenser for every 10 floors such as turbidity, coliform bacteria, pH, total dissolved solids (TDS), chlorine, residual (free) chlorine, arsenic, lead, copper, nitrate, benzene at least one month before Performance Verification and monitoring piped water that delivers drinking water, testing water from dispensers quarterly. Turbidity must be equal or less than 1.0 NTU. pH must be between 6.5 and 9.0. TDS must be equal or less than 500 mg/L. Total Chlorine must be equal or less than 5 mg. L. Residual (free) chlorine must be equal or less than 5 mg/L. Total Coliforms must not be detected in a 100 ml sample. Lead must be equal or less than 1 micro gram/L. Sampling frequency can be reduced to once a year, if the results are under limit two consecutive times. Copper must be equal or less than 2 mg/L. Sampling frequency can be reduced to two a year. If the results are under limit four consecutive times, then there is no need to monitor anymore. The test result must be submitted to WELL annually. Last part is display of water management information to promote drinking water transparency provides another 1 point.

For W06, Drinking Water Promotion, encouraging people to drink water easily by provide water dispenser minimum one per floor within 30 meter of all users and in all dining areas, designing for water bottle-refilling with maintenance provides 1 point.

W07, Moisture Management provides total 3 points, to limit the bacteria and mold growth, the project needs building envelope that incorporates site drainage and storm water management, air tightness testing, vapor pressure differentials, entryway strategies to minimize water permeation, drainage plane from interior to exterior cladding, limiting wicking in porous materials by using non-porous materials such as closed-cell foams, waterproofing membranes, metal between porous meterials or free-draining spaces, provides 1 point. Using protection or implementing measures to eliminate condensation on cold surfaces such as basement, slab-on-grade floor and liquid water as interior housewrap such as basement, bathroom, kitchen provides another 1 point. Label or manual at point-of-connection to shut-off pipe and all water treatment devices need backflow prevention system such as air gap or backflow preventer valve. The last 1 point is to manage moisture by scheduling inspection, notification system in the building and to submit all inspection result to WELL annually.

W08 Hygiene Support, the highest points in the Water subject, total 4 points. Part 1, 1 point, bathroom needs trash receptacle in toilet stall if toilet paper cannot be flushed, free of 50% subsidized sanitary pads, storage support in toilet stalls, at least one bathroom has wheelchair bathroom, one bathroom per project for infant changing table, syringe drop box, single-user bathroom needs occupancy signage, self-primed liquid-seal trap in floor drain. For public projects such as airport, family bathroom are required, containing changing table for infant, child size toilet and sinks, motion sensor for lights, slip-resistant floor, grab bars, hook or shelf for bags in toilet stall, wheelchair accessibility by local code. Part 2, 1 point, bathroom needs hands-free flushing toilet, contactless soap dispenser and hand-drying, hands-free exiting door, sensor-activated, programmable line-purge faucet. Part 3, 1 point, faucet design avoiding flowing directly into the drain, splash limited inside the sink, minimum width of 23 cm sink size, flowing column of water minimum 20 cm and at least 7.5 cm away from sink edge. Part 4, 1 point, handwashing supply must has fragrance-free liquid soap through sealed dispensers, paper towels or hand dryers with HEPA filter or fabric towel rolls and signage with proper hand washing steps.

== Nourishment ==
WELL Nourishment concept supports healthy and sustainable eating patterns by accessing to fruits and vegetables more and limiting highly processed foods, nudging users to choose better choices. Poor nutrition responses to one in five people death globally. Unhealthy eating is worse than combining of drug, alcohol, and tobacco. Diets usually is low in fruits, vegetables, whole grains, nuts, seeds, but instead flood with highly processed foods such as refined sugars and oils. In 2019, the EAT-Lancet Commission developed best food option. By developing environment conditions that influence users to change diets with holistic approach, supportive policies.

=== N01 - N02 Precondition ===
N01 Fruits and Vegetables, WELL ensures to operate food outlet for at least two varieties of fruits and non-fried vegetables that would be clearly be seen by users. Each food outlets are at least 50% of food options are fruits or non-fried vegetables.

N02, Nutritional Transparency, other type of foods such as packaged food and beverage must display the total calories per serving, macronutrient, and sugar content. Owner must communicates users on food allergy. High sugar foods or over than 25 grams of sugar per serving is banned from the menu in dining spaces or at least identified in the items for users to make a decision.

=== N03 - N13 Optimization ===
N03 Refined Ingredients, restriction of sugars by limit beverage under 25 g of sugar per container, at least 25% of beverages contain no sugar, and non-beverage food except fruit contain sugar under 25 gram per serving receives 1 point. Whole grains promotion by 50% of grain-based food contains whole grain the most receives another 1 point.

N04 Food Advertising, eliminating sugar drink, deep-fried food advertising, and sale area promotes water, fruits and vegetables consumption instead, receives 1 point.

N05 Artificial Ingredients, phasing out or restrict of artificial ingredients such as colorings, sweeteners, food preservation, fats and oils by clearly labeled on packaging or signage receives 1 point.

N06 Portion Sizes, dining space promoting healthy size of food receives 1 point by limiting portion below 650 kCal or over 650 kcal menu under 50%, and dish or bowl size must not be over certain area or volume. Primary school students, secondary school students, and adults plate size are no more than 20, 25, and 30 cm diameter.

N07 Nutrition Education, providing nutritional knowledge by cooking demonstration or dietary education learning by nutritionist or gardening workshop receives 1 point.

N08 Mindful Eating provides 2 points by dedicating eating space within 200 meters walking distance of the boundary of the project that contains tables and chairs to 25% of users at peak, protects from outdoor climate hazard, provides variety of seating options from small to large group of people, and if there is employees or students then they would provides daily 30 minutes break for meal.

N09 Special Diets, alternative food providing to food allergen person, total 2 points. For part 1, 1 point, providing food at least does not include peanut and tree nuts or gluten and wheat or soy or sesame or animal products including seafood, dairy, and eggs. For part 2, 1 point, clearly labeling on packaging, menus, signage that the food contains peanut, fish, shellfish, soy, milk, egg, wheat, tree nuts, sesame, gluten.

N10 Food Preparation, providing space for user's meal such as cold storage, countertop, sink for dish and hand washing, microwave or toaster, reusable plates, garbage bin receives 1 point.

N11 Responsible Food Sourcing, sourcing 50% foods that are certified organic and 25% animal product lines that are certified organic by Gran Sasso Science Institute (GSSI) or Seafood Certification Scheme by labeling for sustainable receives 1 point.

N12 Food Production receives 2 points by providing garden or greenhouse with food-bearing plants or edible landscape or hydroponic or aeroponic farming which is accessible to users in regular hours and growing area both horizontal and vertical at least 0.09 sq. m per user or 0.05 sq. m per student, except hydroponic and aeroponic farming can be half of normal system, and users can access to food growing tools, in which the area is within 400 meter walking distance.

N13 Local Food Environment, supporting local food by locating the project near fruit and vegetable supermarket or farmers' market that open at least once a week within 400 meters walk distance, or serving local agriculture program or hosting weekly sale of fruits and vegetables receives 1 point.

== Light ==
WELL Lighting concept aims to create lighting that reduces circadian disruption to improve sleep quality and mood and productivity. Humans are diurnal driving by circadian systems or internal clock. Disruption of it leads to obesity, diabetes, depression, breast cancer, metabolic and sleep disorders. Insufficient light can lead to disruption.

=== L01 - L02 Precondition ===
L01 Light Exposure, daylighting design hugely integrates in a project by daylight simulation such as the Spatial Daylight Analysis that shows how much daylight illuminates throughout working hours. Adequate daylighting level can be decided on the interior layout or the building design such as a distance from windows. For the project that finds it difficult for daylight access, circadian lighting design can replace daylight such as an Intrinsically photosensitive retinal ganglion cell (ipRGC) receiving enough light at least 150 Melanopic Lux (EML)

L02 Visual Lighting Design, WELL still keeps visual lighting design which is conventional lighting method for user's visual comfort and acuity. Lighting design standard in WELL follows Illuminating Engineering Society Lighting Library or EN standard 12464-1&2 or ISO 8995-1 or Chinese Standard GB 50034 or CIBSE SLL Code for Lighting. Alternately WELL allows light level threshold from U.S. General Services Administration's facilities standards.

=== L03 - L09 Optimization ===
L03 Circadian Lighting Design, if the project chose precondition part of circadian lighting, the project receives 1 point automatically. For the project that achieves at least 275 Melanopic Lux (EML), the project receives more 2 points.

L04 Electric Light Glare Control, limiting glare from indoor artificial light, receiving 2 points, by using 100% upward lighting or fixture classified Unified Glare Rating (UGR) equal or under 16 or all fixtures does not exceed 6,000 candela/sq.m at angle between 45 and 90 degrees from bottom, it can be done in lighting calculation software that results in UGR equal or under 16.

L05 Daylight Design Strategies, providing daylight exposure indoors through design strategies. Daylight plan for the project receives 1 point for workstations near the window within 7.5 meters, but if positioned within 5.5 meters, it receives 2 points instead. Integrating of solar shading system with manual control receives 1 point, or with automated control system throughout year receives 2 points instead.

L06 Daylight Simulation, daylight calculation that results equal or higher than 55% of project occupancy area, receiving 300 lux more than 50% of annual time of use, is received 1 point. If it results equal or higher than 75%, then it will be received 2 points.

L07 Visual Balance receives 1 point by either design by at least three of five parameters of luminance ratio of horizontal and vertical plane at maximum 10 times, 0.4 ratio of minimum illuminance and average illuminance on horizontal task plane, using automation system by changing light characters at least light levels over a period at least 10 minutes, using consistent Correlated color temperature (CCT) plus and minus 200 Kelvin, or the project is designed by lighting professional that takes those ratios in account.

L08 Electric Light Quality, for quality of light fixtures, total 3 points, all light fixture, except decorative lights and emergency lights, that color rendering is equal or over color rendering index (CRI) of 90 or CRI of 80 with R9 equal or over than 50 or TM-30 of color rendering fidelity (Rf) equal or more than 78 and color rendering gamut (Rg) equal or more than 100 with Rcs,h1 from -1% to 15%, will receive 1 point, and that flicker of luminaires classified as "reduced flicker operation" or defined 1, 2, 3 recommended practices by IEEE standard 1789-2015 LED or short term light flicker (Pst LM) and Stroboscopic Visibility Measure (SVM) equal or under 1.0 and 0.6 per NEMA 77-2017, will receive 2 points.

L09 Occupant Lighting Control, providing individual control of light for one per 60 sq.m. or one per 10 occupants will be received 1 point, but if there are one per 30 sq.m. or one per 5 occupants, then it will be received 2 points, with the project has lighting control in each zone was set up at least three lighting levels, able to change group of lights with different light beams or color or CCT, all users be able to control light manually by keypad or digital interface, and separately control of lighting for presentation. Task light provided with no cost to employees and light levels and direction can be controlled by users independently under shielded light source receives 1 point.

== Movement ==
To promote physical activity by creating opportunities through spaces is a substantial impact to decrease risk of death by 10% and 25%, which more than half a million and one million people globally would not have died because of inactivity. Global lifespan could increase by 0.68 years. Physical inactivity leads to pre-mature death and chronic illness, type II diabetes, cardiovascular disease, depression, stroke, dementia and cancer. 23% of adult globally are inactive caused by rising urbanization and economic development. Sitting or sedentary globally average 3–9 hours daily among adults that linked to mentioned illnesses.

=== V01 - V02 Precondition ===
V01 Active Buildings and Communities, the summary of optimization points which WELL requires the project to achieve as least one point from four optimization features specifically V03 Circulation Network for visible, open to access and aesthetic stair circulation, V04 Facilities for Active Occupants such as cycling network with bike parking or showers, lockers and changing rooms, V05 Site Planning and Selection such as pedestrian-friendly environment or mass transit within walking distance, V08 Physical Activity Spaces and Equipment such as free sport opportunities and facilities or green space for outdoor activities.

V02, Ergonomic Workstation Design, intended for users to adjust furniture freely such as monitor position, work surface height, chair, standing desk and foot support including user's orientation or instruction.

=== V03 - V10 Optimization ===
V03 Circulation Network provides total 3 points, designing aesthetic staircase by music, artwork, designed to have light levels of at least 215 lux in use, windows or skylights that provide daylight or nature views, natural design elements, gamification receives 1 point. Integrating point-of-decision signage on stair area such as motivational element receives 1 point. Promoting visible stair that close to the entrance receives 1 point.

V04 Facilities for Active Occupants, providing cycling network and parking for bikes with shortterm and longterm with basic bike maintenance tools and minimum Bike Score® of 50, 200 m walk distance of an existing cycling network receives 2 points, and with showers, lockers, and changing facilities 16 places plus one for every 1,000 occupants receives another 1 point.

V05 Site Planning and Selection, site planning for walking and connection to public transportation minimum Walk Score® of 70 or within a 400 m distance of the project boundary, by selecting sites with friendly streets and friendly footpath receives 2 points, and with walkable distance to mass transit receives another 2 points.

V06 Physical Activity Opportunities, providing physical activity for occupants at no cost, by qualified professional, not in form of punishment by at least one 30-minute event per week or one 60-minute per week for school students receives 1 point, and for not less than total 150 minutes per week or not less 60 minutes per day for school students receive 2 points.

V07 Active Furnishings, providing at least manual or electric work surface or treadmill or stationary bicycle or step machine, and with 50% ot 90% of workstations receives 1 point ot 2 points in this active furnishing.

V08 Physical Activity Spaces and Equipment, providing indoor fitness space at no cost receives 2 points either the space includes two types of exercises or equipment that allow use by at least 5% of occupants at any time or has minimum size of 25 sq. m plus 0.1 sq. m per occupant until 930 sq. m, but WELL also allows if the project gives free pass to access fitness facility within 200 meters walking distance instead.

V09 Physical Activity Promotion receives only 1 point, if the project offer at least two of five activities to employees such as prize from sport competition, subsidy for employee sport member, reducing of health care cost, flexible work hours, paid time off at least four days per year physical activity, and either utilization of incentive program for 50% or improvement at least 10%, and if students are in account, it needs program to reduce TV viewing, computer or smartphone use, gaming, and to teaching physical activity or movement or physical activity breaks.

V10 Self-Monitoring Support, receive only 1 point by providing free fitness tracker at no cost or at least 50%, measuring at least two physical activities and at least one additional activity such as sleep or mindfulness.

== Thermal comfort ==
Holistic approach and intervention to help design building that focus on individual thermal discomfort, which is subjective under the same conditions. One-size-fits all does not suit for large people. Personal thermal control should be used to improve productivity and decrease sick building syndrome. Due to large number of people, thermal comfort conditions should create baseline satisfaction for the largest number of people. It is greatly influencing users and one of the biggest impact to motivation, alertness, focus and mood. It should provide acceptable thermal environment to minimum 80% of users, in fact only 11% met accepted human satisfaction in the U.S., and 41% were dissatisfaction which detrimental to business. Employees perform 15% poorer in hot conditions and 14% poorer in cold conditions.

=== T01 Thermal Performance Precondition ===
The first part, WELL ensures thermal indoor environment to be controlled. For HVAC control system (mechanically conditioned space), acceptable thermal comfort by PMV/PPD model must be in between -0.5 and 0.5 over 90% of regularly occupied spaces. For naturally conditioned system, the minimum prevailing mean outdoor temperature (tpma (out)), calculated from average outdoor temperature entire day, must be 10 degrees Celsius and indoor temperature of 31% of the tpma (out) plus 14.3 degrees Celsius. The maximum tpma (out) must be under 33.5 degrees Celsius and indoor temperature of 31% of the tpma (out) plus 21.3 degrees Celsius. For example, the tpma (out) 33.5 degrees Celsius, the indoor temperature shall not be over 31.7 degrees Celsius. If tpma (out) is over than 33.5 degrees Celsius then a mechanically conditioned space would be in place. WELL allows the project to use optimization points from T06 Thermal Comfort Monitoring with dry-bulb temperature data or it can be only thermal comfort surveys by achieving 2 points from T02 Verified Thermal Comfort, 80% satisfaction survey of thermal comfort.

The second part, semi-annual testing on summer and winter for dry-bulb temperature and relative humidity, air speed, and mean radiant temperature or it can only achieve T06 Thermal Comfort Monitoring feature.

=== T02 - T07 Optimization ===
T02 Verified Thermal Comfort, if surveying from user results in 80% satisfaction receives 2 points, and 90% satisfaction receives 3 points, with responses significant 35% of 45 users or 15 from 20 users or 80% of 20 users with sample template.

T03 Thermal Zoning, providing thermostat control point one per 60 sq. m and per 30 sq. m or one per 10 users and 5 users would receives 1 and 2 points, by presenting with digital interface on computer or phone, with temperature sensors apart from exterior wall, windows, doors, direct sunlight, air supply diffusers, mechanical fans, heaters, other significant sources of heat or cold.

T04 Individual Thermal Control, giving personal thermal control for both heating and cooling receives each 1 point, for cooling, implementing user-adjustable thermostat, desk fan or ceiling fan, chair with mechanical cooling system, other solution that affecting PMV change of -0.5 within 15 minutes without changing the PMV for other occupants, for heating, implementing user-adjustable thermostat, electric parabolic space heater, electric heated chair or foot warmers, personal or shared blankets, other solution that affecting PMV change of -0.5 within 15 minutes without changing the PMV for other occupants, thus allowing flexible dress code receives another 1 point.

T05 Radiant Thermal Comfort, radiant thermal comfort management for both heating and cooling receives each 1 point by implement radiant ceilings, walls, floors, radiant panels at least 50% of regularly occupied project area.

T06 Thermal Comfort Monitoring such as dry-bulb temperature and relative humidity receives 1 point with display screen and website or mobile application every 500 sq. m of regularly occupied space, and submitting data annually to WELL with proof of calibration.

T07 Humidity Control, control of humidity receives 1 point by having mechanical system that can maintain relative humidity 30% to 60% at all times or submitting document that modeled relative humidity levels in space from 30% to 60% for at least 98% of all business hours or by meeting thermal comfort monitoring (T06) with relative humidity levels from 30% to 60% except high-humidity spaces.

== Sound ==
Providing holistic approach to address acoustical comfort of a space, measuring satisfaction of users by human response to mechanical vibrations through a medium, such as air. Sleep disturbance, hypertension, reduction of mental arithmetic skills in children are caused by exterior noise and HVAC, appliances noises. Myocardial infarction risk can be cause by traffic noise at night. Bad reverberation times and background sound levels can affect speech intelligibility in educational areas where aural comprehension is vital for memory retention. The planning and commissioning of an isolated and balanced HVAC system is firm baseline for anticipated background noise level. Adding facade elements such as mass and glazing, sealing gaps and providing airspace between enclosed spaces can increase occupant comfort. Replacing hard surfaces with absorptive materials improve speech projection and acoustical privacy. Consistent background sound levels is provided by sound masking system, increase the signal-to-noise ratio to increase privacy.

=== S01 Sound Mapping Precondition ===
For labeling acoustic zone, interior design must have a design of acoustics zoning label such as loud zone, quiet zone, mixed zone, and circulation zone to mitigate a sound transmission from loud zones to quiet zones.

For providing acoustic design plan, the design concept shall incorporate acoustical comfort, background noise, speech privacy, and reverberation time and/or impact noise within the project boundary, or it can be an acoustical engineering professional in acoustic to evaluate existing sounds and to recommend solutions and measurements.

=== S02 - S06 Optimization ===
S02 Maximum Noise Levels, limiting background noise levels over period of five minutes and average sound pressure levels do not exceed tier 1, receiving 1 point, that average Sound pressure level (SPL) for category 1 to 4, 40 dBA to 55 dBA and 60 dBC to 75 dBC, and maximum SPL from 50 to 65 dBA or 70 to 85 dBC. For tier 2, receiving 3 points instead, that average SPL for category 1 to 4, 35 to 50 dBA and 55 dBC to 70 dBC, and maximum SPL from 45 to 60 dBA or 65 to 80 dBC.

S03 Sound Barriers, sound barriers that designed for sound isolation at walls and doors meets Sound transmission class (STC) or Weighted Sound Reduction (Rw) values from minimum 40 STC to 60 STC, and doors with minimum 30 STC would receives 1 point. Achieving minimum Noise Isolation Class (NIC) or Weight Difference Level (Dw) for each wall type from minimum 35 NIC to 55 NIC, or the sum of NIC or Dw combined with Noise Criteria Rating (NC) or Weighted Sound Pressure Level (LAeq) with minimum 70 to 85 NIC + NC or Dw + LAeq would receive 2 points.

S04 Reverberation Time, maintain persistence of voices in the room receives 2 points, for example, area for music rehearsal for maximum 1.1 seconds, area for learning for maximum 0.6 seconds that could be verified by technical document or performance test.

S05 Sound Reducing Surfaces, furnishing quality surfaces of room that meets criteria of tier 1 or 2, receiving 1 or 2 points, for example, open workspaces, minimum noise reduction coefficient (NRC) OR Alpha-w of 0.75 or 0.90 and minimum furniture height and NRC OR Alpha-w with minimum height of 1.2 m above finished floor and minimum 0.70, cumulatively at least 10% of occupied project area.

S06 Minimum Background Sound, artificial background sound by making sound masking system receives 1 point to increase privacy that produce 1/3 octave band output signal and minimum frequency spectrum of 100 Hz to 5 Hz. Providing enhanced speech reduction automatically receives 1 point by achieving 2 points from S03 or S05, and S06 part 1.

== Materials ==
Promoting the use of low-hazard cleaning products and practices that reduce health impact, mitigation of contamination and public health, management of waste, low-hazard pesticides. For some toxic, prone to bioaccumulation materials carrying old chemicals such as lead that accounted of a one million deaths in 2017. CCA in wood structures can leach arsenic in soil where children can be exposed. New materials such as perfluorinated alkyl compounds (PFCs), orthophthalates, some heavy metals and halogenated flame retardants (HFRs) are superior but cause negative health impact. Volatile organic compound (VOCs) are so common in insulation, paints, coatings, adhesives, furniture and furnishings, composite wood products and flooring that cause respiratory issue and cancer risks. Two solutions are to increase knowledge of materials and to promote assessment and selection to minimize impacts.

=== X01 - X03 Precondition ===
For X01 Material Restrictions, Asbestos level in newly installed products is limit under 1,000 ppm by weight or area. Mercury content for fluorescent lamp and sodium-vapor lamp is limit to 2.5 mg to 32 mg or passed the Restriction of Hazardous Substances Directive (RoHS). For fire alarms, meters, sensors, relays, thermostats, and load break switches is limit to no more than 1000 ppm of mercury by weight and 100 ppm of lead or certified the RoHS. For newly installed paints, lead content shall not be over than 100 ppm by weight and certified by the Living Building Challenge's Red List or the Cradle-to-cradle design list or Registration, Evaluation, Authorisation and Restriction of Chemicals (REACH) and Candidate List of Substances of Very High Concern (SHVC) lists. Drinking water pipes are limit to 0.25% of lead, or labeled as American National Standards Institute (ANSI) or NSF.

For X02 Interior Hazardous Materials Management, if the building was constructed before the enactment of asbestos banning law, an inspector must qualifies for asbestos containing materials (ACM) and performs polarized light microscopy (PLM) or transmission electron microscopy (TEM). ACM must be removed from the project if it was found. Same as an asbestos management, removing process needs to be done if lead containing materials were found in paints. Polychlorinated biphenyl (PCB) is restricted especially in a caulk, it needs to be removed.

For X03 CCA and Lead Management, outdoor materials such as chromated copper arsenate (CCA) is banned. Lead hazard over the limit in bare soil, turf, artificial turf, recycled tire, and paint shall be examined and be removed or replaced.

=== X04 - X11 Optimization ===
X04 Site Remediation, assess and mitigate site hazards by remediation process of a risk-based approach to sustainable remediation receives 1 point.

X05 Enhanced Material Restrictions, material of at least 50% of furniture, millwork, fixture is limited 100 Parts-per notation (ppm) of halogenated flame retardants (HFR), polyfluoroalkyl substances (PFAS), lead, cadmium, mercury, or do not contain textiles and plastic at all, and all electrical products have RoHS restrictions would be awarded 1 point. For flooring products are limited 100 ppm of HFR, PFAS, orthophthalates, and insulation products are limited 100 ppm of HFR, and ceiling and wall panels are limited 100 ppm of HFR and orthophthalates, and pipe and fittings are limited 100 ppm of orthophthalates would receive 1 point.

X06 VOC Restrictions, Volatile organic compound restriction from wet-applied products and furniture, architectural and interior products receives 4 points.

X07 Materials Transparency, selecting products with disclosed ingredients, enhanced ingredient disclosure, and third-party verified ingredients receives 1 point for each, total 3 points.

X08 Materials Optimization, at least 25 distinct products having ingredients inventoried to 100 ppm and free of compound listed in the Living Building Challenge's Red List or the Cradle-to-cradle design list or REACH Restriction and Substance of very high concern (SVHC) lists, or products purchased for future repair would receive 1 point. For optimized products, at least 15 distinct products are certified under the Cradle to Cradle Certified, the Living Product Challenge, and the Global GreenTag.

X09 Waste Management, implementing a waste management plan by identification of roles, sources, protocols to clean and track wastes receives 1 point.

X10 Pest Management and Pesticide Use, implementing integrated pest management (IPM) for indoor and outdoor space receives 1 point.

X11 Cleaning Products and Protocols, developing cleaning plan receives 2 points.

== Mind ==
Mental health issue is estimated 14.3% of deaths worldwide, 8 million death per year, including substance use affect 13% of the global burden of disease and 32% of years lived with disability. Alcohol and drug use is significantly premature death, alcohol alone affect 3.3 million deaths and 5% global burden of disease. Depression and anxiety ranking first and sixth place global burden of disease, with depression accounting for 4% global burden of disease and caused the largest disability worldwide.

Global economy lost from depression and anxiety 1 trillion dollars due to lost productivity, 18% of adults experience the condition, over 30% of adults will experience it during their lifetime, despite that, spending to fight the issue were less than 2 dollars per person. High income and low income country, people experience the issue 35-50% and 76-85% without treatment which causes suicide more than 800,000 deaths per years worldwide. Even that, people with the issue have mortality rate 2.2 times higher than normal and a median loss of 10 years life.

The issue could be mitigated by policies, programs, design in workplace promotion, prevention, interventions. Reducing stigma, promoting positive work environments, stress management programs, and strategies, substance services and treatment, optimal sleep, increasing nature contact can improve overall mental health.

=== M01 - M02 Precondition ===
For M01 Mental Health Promotion, WELL ensures that users receive at least two from five options such as education on mental health quarterly, trainings annually, mindfulness program weekly, healthy working hours, a space for relaxation. The project also sends users some form of communication such as annual communication and onboarding to address mental health and well-being benefits with resources.

For M02 Nature and Place, common spaces, rooms, and circulation routes must integrate natural elements related subjects such as natural shape material, plants, water, nature views. The project must designed to provide a celebration of culture and social cognition, celebration of place, integration of art, and human delight that connect to place, by Living Building Challenge 4.0, Core Imperative 19 - Beauty + Biophilia hypothesis topic.

=== M03 - M11 Optimization ===
M03 Mental Health Services, offering mental health screening for depression and substance use, providing licensed mental health professional, guidance process for next step for 1 point. Mental health services such as clinical screening, inpatient treatment, outpatient treatment, prescription medication at no cost or subsidy, information on benefits coverage, consultation receives 1 point. Supporting sick leave, shortterm and longterm leave, interpersonal support, adjustment work schedule, adjustment of workplace to quieter area receives 1 point. Mental health recovery by trauma-focus psychotherapy, psychological first aid (PFA), bereavement counseling, information on benefits coverage to additional services receives 1 point.

M04 Mental Health Education, mental health education for regular occupants by managing personal mental health at work, providing in-person or virtually education receives 1 point, and health education for managers by reducing workplace stress, burnout, motivation receives additional 1 point.

M05 Stress Management, develop stress management plan by assessing overwork by more than 48 hours per week, absenteeism, not using paid time off, performance, turnover rates, survey results, improvement of employee stress to change of organization, employee participation receives 2 points.

M06 Restorative Opportunities, supporting healthy working hours by provide minimum 11 consecutive resting hours per day, 24 consecutive hours off per week, 48 hours for those who in shift work, and for eligible employees, minimum 20 days paid time off per year, no work during time off, sick to vacation clearly defined, accrual policy is defined, and for school, do not start earlier than 8:30 am receives 1 point, and additional 1 point for nap allowing and good acoustically separated nap area for 1% of eligible employee at least 30 minutes.

M07 Restorative Spaces, providing break space for users to restorative and encourage relief from fatigue with minimum 7 sqm plus 0.1 sqm per regular users or 186 sqm, with calming adjustable lighting, sound intervention of natural features, thermal control, movable lightweight chars, cushions, natural elements, subdued colors, visual privacy including signage explaining its purpose receives 1 point.

M08 Restorative Programming, for restorative programming such as mindfulness training course, yoga, digital mindfulness offering receives 1 point.

M09 Enhanced Access to Nature, floor plan that at least 75% of workstations have a sight to natural elements winthin 10 meters receives 1 point, and providing outdoor nature access and to one green space or blue space within 200 meter walk distance from boundary, and total green space at least 0.5 hectare receives additional 1 point.

M10 Tobacco Cessation, providing resources and motivation, rewarding, counseling, tobacco prescription for tobacco quitting and limiting of tobacco receives 3 points.

M11 Substance Use Services, education of drug use receives 1 point, and additional 1 point for clinical services.

== Community ==
Estimated 235 million urban families live in low standard housing, leading to poor health outcomes like asthma, infectious disease and cardiovascular. Only 55% of U.S. companies see diversity as a priority, in UK, women earns 80.2% of men's. Spaces usually are not design for diverse needs. Surveying can bring more returns on investment. Fostering civic engagement and espouse can increase employee rentiontion and attraction and financial returns. Design plays critical role to let all users access.

=== C01 - C04 Precondition ===
C01 Health and well-being promotion by provides WELL feature guide and regularly communicates to the users. C02 Integrative design by incorporating all stakeholders to set the health and well-being goals for the project. C03 Emergency preparedness by implementing emergency management planning and post-occupancy evaluation are also required. C04 Occupant survey by implement survey program to users.

=== C05 - C14 Optimization ===
C05 Enhanced Occupant Survey, total 4 points by using additional survey and analysis for 1 point, using comparison pre and post survey for 1 point, implementing aspirational satisfaction and unmet satisfaction plan for 1 point, focus group activity by interview and evaluate result for 1 point.

C06 Health Services and Benefits, providing employees with a health benefits policy at no cost or subsidized, offering on-demand health services, offering sick leave, supporting vaccinate program receives each 1 point, total 4 points.

C07 Enhanced Health and Well-Being Promotion, promoting culture of health by communications and promotion group receives 1 point. Having at least one dedicated executive-level employee to plan and promote heathy activities receives 1 point.

C08 New Parent Support, offering new parent leave support receives 1, 2, 3 points for paid leave at least 12, 18, 30 weeks. For breastfeeding support, such as break time and giving insulated cooler or refrigerator access receives 1 point. C09 New Mother Support, providing lactation room at least 2.1 x 2.1 m with appropriated elements in the building receives 2 points.

C10 Family Support, childcare support services, offering family leave, offering bereavement support receives each 1 point, total 3 points.

C11 Civic Engagement, promoting community engagement and community space for employees receives each 1 point, total 2 points.

C12 Diversity and Inclusion by creating Diversity, equity, and inclusion (DEI) assessment and action plan, DEI system, DEI hiring practives each receives 1 point, total 3 points.

C13 Accessibility and Universal Design, implementing universal design receives 2 points.

C14 Emergency Resources, providing emergency information or procedures, building notification system, Automated external defibrillator (AEDs), first aid kit, and emergency training for medical emergencies and security team or Cardiopulmonary resuscitation (CPR), first aid, AED usage trainings receives 1 point. Providing opioid pain relieve kit for emergency such as naloxone receives 1 point.

== Innovation ==
=== I01 - I05 Optimization ===
This category has no requirement but it can provide additional points such as new intervention for maximum 10 topics, each receives 1 point. If one member of the project team has WELL AP, it automatically receives 1 point. Offering WELL educational tours at least six times per year receives 1 point. If the project commits in any well-being or health program that approved by IWBI and it was completed within three years, it receives 1 point. If the project achieve any green building certification that approved by IWBI, it receives 5 points of rating.
