= Noise control =

Strategies to reduce noise pollution or its impact

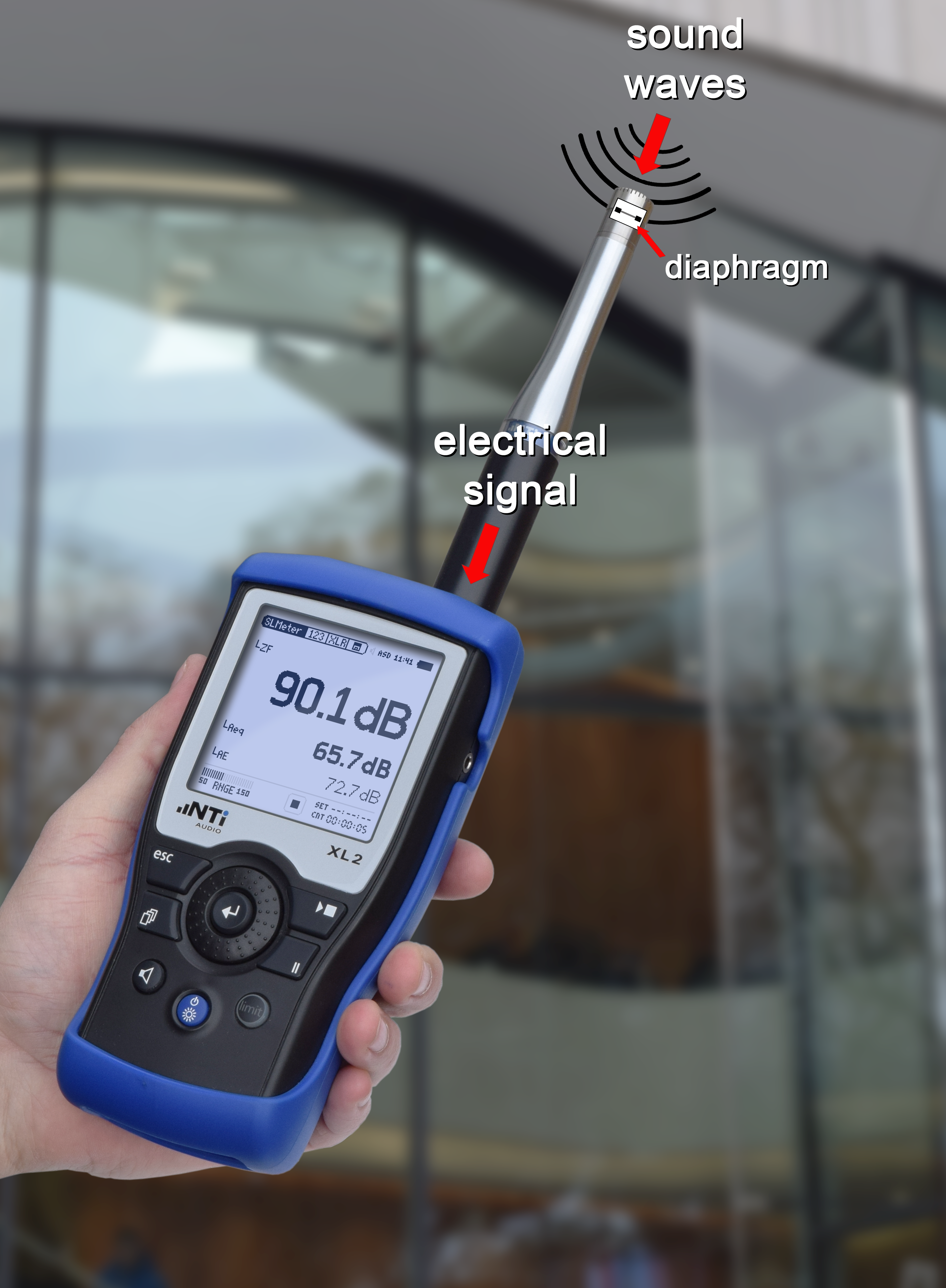
A sound level meter

Noise control or noise mitigation is a set of strategies to reduce noise pollution or to reduce the impact of that noise, whether outdoors or indoors.

== Overview ==
The main areas of noise mitigation or abatement are: transportation noise control, architectural design, urban planning through zoning codes, and occupational noise control. Roadway noise and aircraft noise are the most pervasive sources of environmental noise. Social activities may generate noise levels that consistently affect the health of populations residing in or occupying areas, both indoor and outdoor, near entertainment venues that feature amplified sounds and music that present significant challenges for effective noise mitigation strategies.

Multiple techniques have been developed to address interior sound levels, many of which are encouraged by local building codes. In the best case of project designs, planners are encouraged to work with design engineers to examine trade-offs of roadway design and architectural design. These techniques include design of exterior walls, party walls, and floor and ceiling assemblies; moreover, there are a host of specialized means for damping reverberation from special-purpose rooms such as auditoria, concert halls, entertainment and social venues, dining areas, audio recording rooms, and meeting rooms.

Many of these techniques rely upon material science applications of constructing sound baffles or using sound-absorbing liners for interior spaces. Industrial noise control is a subset of interior architectural control of noise, with emphasis on specific methods of sound isolation from industrial machinery and for protection of workers at their task stations.

Sound masking is the active addition of noise to reduce the annoyance of certain sounds, the opposite of soundproofing.

== Standards, recommendations, and guidelines ==
Organizations each have their own standards, recommendations/guidelines, and directives for what levels of noise workers are permitted to be around before noise controls must be put into place.

=== Occupational Safety and Health Administration (OSHA) ===
OSHA's requirements state that when workers are exposed to noise levels above 90 A-weighted decibels (dBA) in 8-hour time-weighted averages (TWA), administrative controls and/or new engineering controls must be implemented in the workplace. OSHA also requires that impulse noises and impact noises must be controlled to prevent these noises from reaching past 140 dB peak sound pressure levels (SPL).

=== Mine Safety and Health Organization (MSHA) ===
MSHA requires that administrative and/or engineering controls must be implemented in the workplace when miners are exposed to levels above 90 dBA TWA. If noise levels exceed 115 dBA, miners are required to wear hearing protection. MSHA, therefore, requires that noise levels be reduced below 115 dB TWA. Measuring noise levels for noise control decision-making must integrate all noises from 90 dBA to 140 dBA.

=== Federal Railroad Administration (FRA) ===
The FRA recommends that worker exposure to noise should be reduced when their noise exposure exceeds 90 dBA for an 8-hour TWA. Noise measurements must integrate all noises, including intermittent, continuous, impact, and impulse noises of 80 dBA to 140 dBA.

=== U.S. Department of Defense ===
The Department of Defense (DoD) suggests that noise levels be controlled primarily through engineering controls. The DoD requires that all steady-state noises be reduced to levels below 85 dBA and that impulse noises be reduced below 140 dB peak SPL. TWA exposures are not considered for the DoD's requirements.

=== European Parliament and Council Directive ===
The European Parliament and Council Directive require noise levels to be reduced or eliminated using administrative and engineering controls. This directive requires lower exposure action levels of 80 dBA for 8 hours with 135 dB peak SPL, along with upper exposure action levels of 85 dBA for 8 hours with 137 peak dBSPL. Exposure limits are 87 dBA for 8 hours with peak levels of 140 peak dBSPL.

== Approaches to noise control ==
An effective model for noise control is the source, path, and receiver model by Bolt and Ingard. Hazardous noise can be controlled by reducing the noise output at its source, minimizing the noise as it travels along a path to the listener, and providing equipment to the listener or receiver to attenuate the noise.

=== Sources ===
A variety of measures aim to reduce hazardous noise at its source. Programs such as Buy Quiet and the National Institute for Occupational Safety and Health (NIOSH) Prevention through design promote research and design of quiet equipment and renovation and replacement of older hazardous equipment with modern technologies.

=== Path ===
The principle of noise reduction through pathway modifications applies to the alteration of direct and indirect pathways for noise. Noise that travels across reflective surfaces, such as smooth floors, can be hazardous. Pathway alterations include physical materials, such as foam, that absorb sound and walls to provide a sound barrier that modifies existing systems that decrease hazardous noise. Sound dampening enclosures for loud equipment and isolation chambers from which workers can remotely control equipment can also be designed. These methods prevent sound from traveling along a path to the worker or other listeners.

=== Receiver ===
In the industrial or commercial setting, workers must comply with the appropriate Hearing conservation program. Administrative controls, such as the restriction of personnel in noisy areas, prevents unnecessary noise exposure. Personal protective equipment such as foam ear plugs or ear muffs to attenuate sound provide a last line of defense for the listener.

== Basic technologies ==
- Sound insulation: prevent the transmission of noise by the introduction of a mass barrier. Common materials have high-density properties such as brick, thick glass, concrete, metal etc.
- Sound absorption: a porous material which acts as a 'noise sponge' by converting the sound energy into heat within the material. Common sound absorption materials include decoupled lead-based tiles, open cell foams and fiberglass
- Vibration damping: applicable for large vibrating surfaces. The damping mechanism works by extracting the vibration energy from the thin sheet and dissipating it as heat. A common material is sound-deadened steel.
- Vibration isolation: prevents transmission of vibration energy from a source to a receiver by introducing a flexible element or a physical break. Common vibration isolators are springs, rubber mounts, cork etc.

== Roadways ==
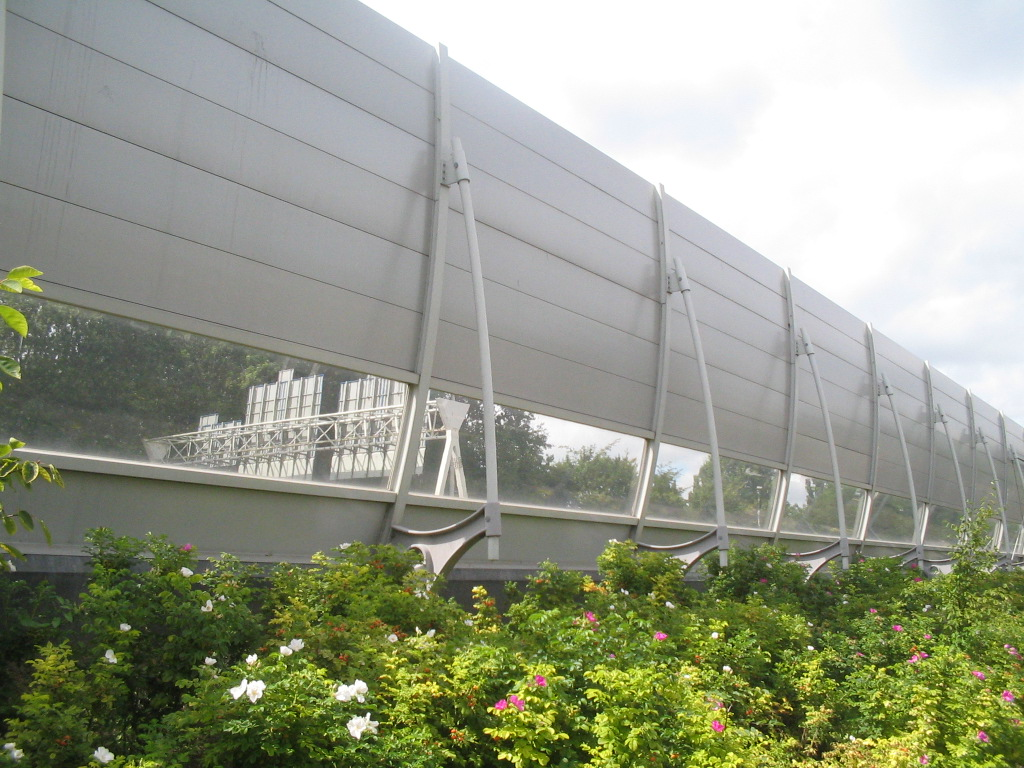
This noise abatement wall in the Netherlands has a transparent section at the driver's eye-level to reduce the visual impact for road users.

Studies on noise barriers have shown mixed results on their ability to effectively reduce noise pollution. Electric and hybrid vehicles could reduce noise pollution, but only if those vehicles make up a high proportion of total vehicles on the road; even if traffic in an urban area reached a makeup of fifty percent electric vehicles, the overall noise reduction achieved would only be a few decibels and would be barely noticeable. Highway noise is today less affected by motor type, since the effects in higher speed are aerodynamic and tire noise related. Other contributions to the reduction of noise at the source are: improved tire tread designs for trucks in the 1970s, better shielding of diesel stacks in the 1980s, and local vehicle regulation of unmuffled vehicles.

The most fertile areas for roadway noise mitigation are in urban planning decisions, roadway design, noise barrier design, speed control, surface pavement selection, and truck restrictions. Speed control is effective since the lowest sound emissions arise from vehicles moving smoothly at 30 to 60 kilometers per hour. Above that range, sound emissions double with every five miles per hour of speed. At the lowest speeds, braking and (engine) acceleration noise dominates.

Selection of road surface pavement can make a difference of a factor of two in sound levels, for the speed regime above 30 kilometers per hour. Quieter pavements are porous with a negative surface texture and use small to medium-sized aggregates; the loudest pavements have transversely-grooved surfaces, positive surface textures, and larger aggregates. Surface friction and roadway safety are important considerations as well for pavement decisions.

When designing new urban freeways or arterials, there are numerous design decisions regarding alignment and roadway geometrics. Use of a computer model to calculate sound levels has become standard practice since the early 1970s. In this way exposure of sensitive receptors to elevated sound levels can be minimized. An analogous process exists for urban mass transit systems and other rail transportation decisions. Early examples of urban rail systems designed using this technology were: Boston MBTA line expansions (1970s), San Francisco BART system expansion (1981), Houston METRORail system (1982), and the MAX Light Rail system in Portland, Oregon (1983).

Noise barriers can be applied to existing or planned surface transportation projects. They are one of the most effective actions taken in retrofitting existing roadways and commonly can reduce adjacent land-use sound levels by up to ten decibels. A computer model is required to design the barrier since terrain, micrometeorology and other locale-specific factors make the endeavor a very complex undertaking. For example, a roadway in a cut or strong prevailing winds can produce a setting where atmospheric sound propagation is unfavorable to any noise barrier.

== Aircraft ==
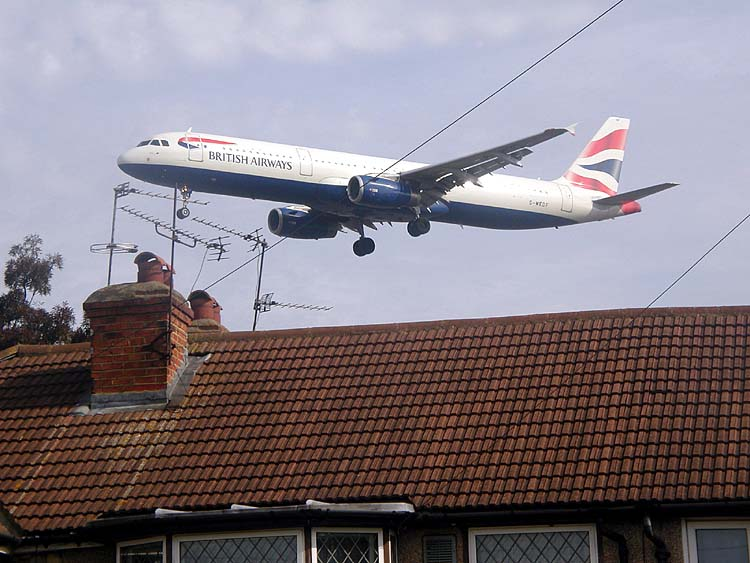
An Airbus A321 of British Airways on its landing approach to London Heathrow Airport, showing its proximity to homes

As in the case of roadway noise, little progress has been made in quelling aircraft noise at the source, other than elimination of loud engine designs from the 1960s and earlier. Because of its velocity and volume, jet turbine engine exhaust noise defies reduction by any simple means.

The most promising forms of aircraft noise abatement are through land planning, flight operations restrictions and residential soundproofing. Flight restrictions can take the form of preferred runway use, departure flight path and slope, and time-of-day restrictions. These tactics are sometimes controversial since they can impact aircraft safety, flying convenience and airline economics.

In 1979, the US Congress authorized the FAA to devise technology and programs to attempt to insulate homes near airports. While this obviously does not aid the exterior environment, the program has been effective for residential and school interiors. Some of the airports at which the technology was applied early on were San Francisco International Airport, Seattle-Tacoma International Airport, John Wayne International Airport and San Jose International Airport in California.

The underlying technology is a computer model which simulates the propagation of aircraft noise and its penetration into buildings. Variations in aircraft types, flight patterns and local meteorology can be analyzed along with benefits of alternative building retrofit strategies such as roof upgrading, window glazing improvement, fireplace baffling, caulking construction seams and other measures. The computer model allows cost-effectiveness evaluations of a host of alternative strategies.

In Canada, Transport Canada prepares noise exposure forecasts (NEF) for each airport, using a computer model similar to that used in the US. Residential land development is discouraged within high-impact areas identified by the forecast.

=== Acoustic liners ===
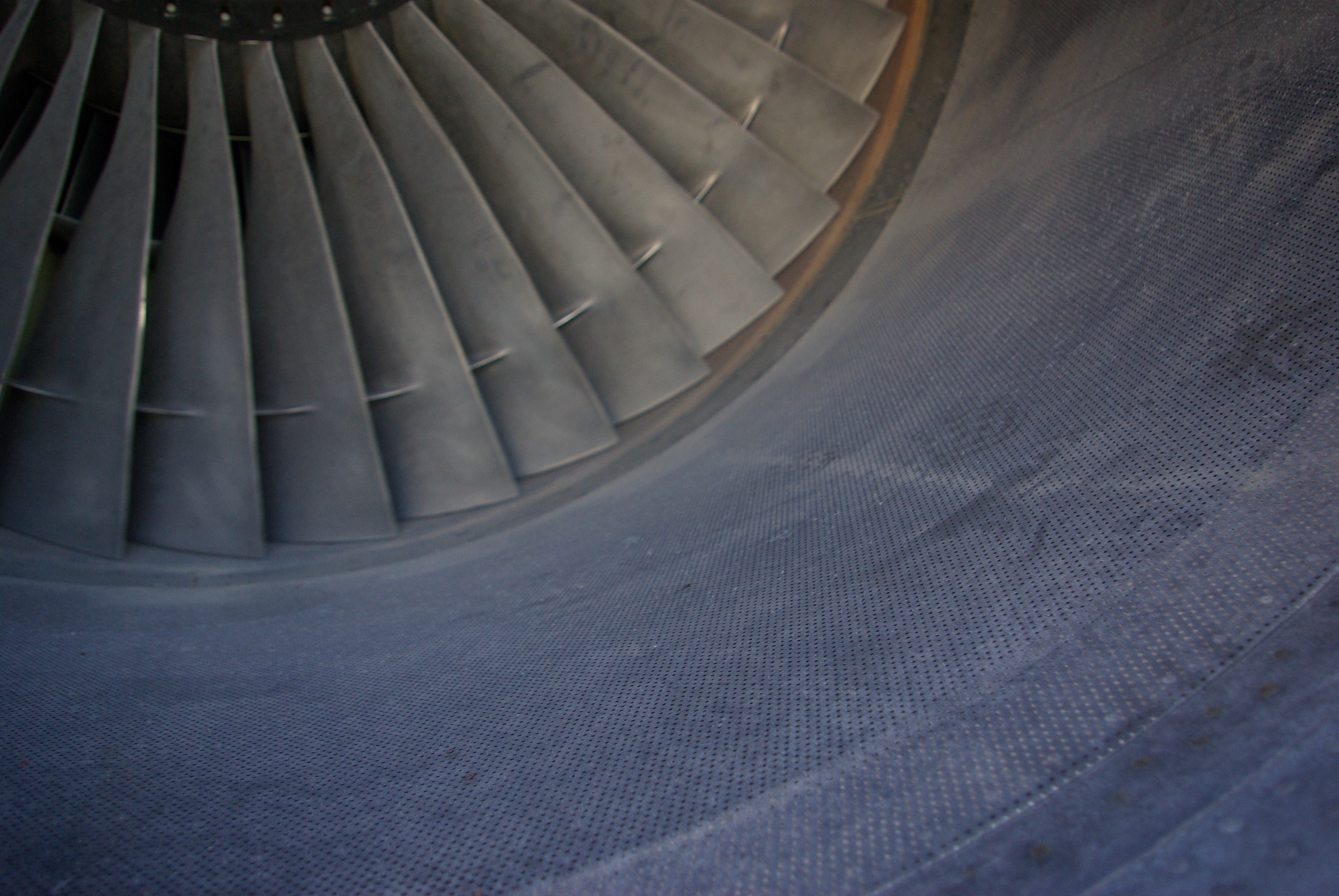
Acoustic liners at the intake of a jet engine

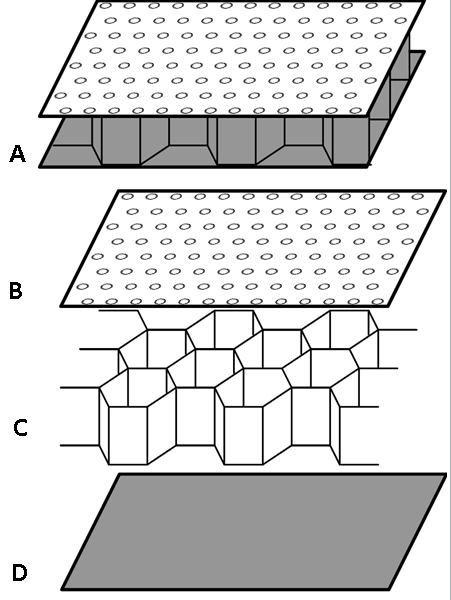
A composite sandwich acoustic liner (A) with perforate face-sheet (B) honeycomb core (C) and back-skin (D)

Aircraft engines, typically turbofans, use acoustic liners to damp engine noise. Liners are applied on the internal walls of the engine nacelle, both in the intake and by-pass ducts, and use Helmholtz resonance principle for the dissipation of incident acoustic energy.

== Architectural solutions ==
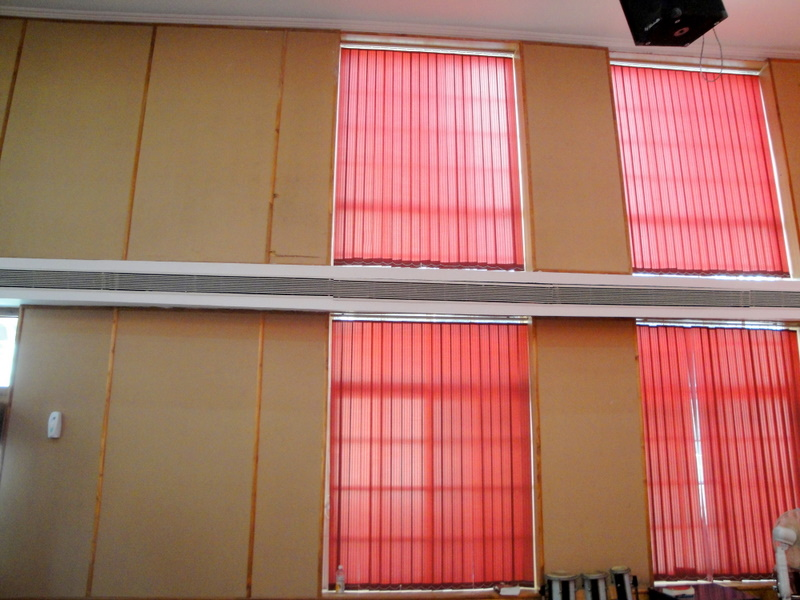
Sound treatment panels contrast with red curtains in a church meeting hall

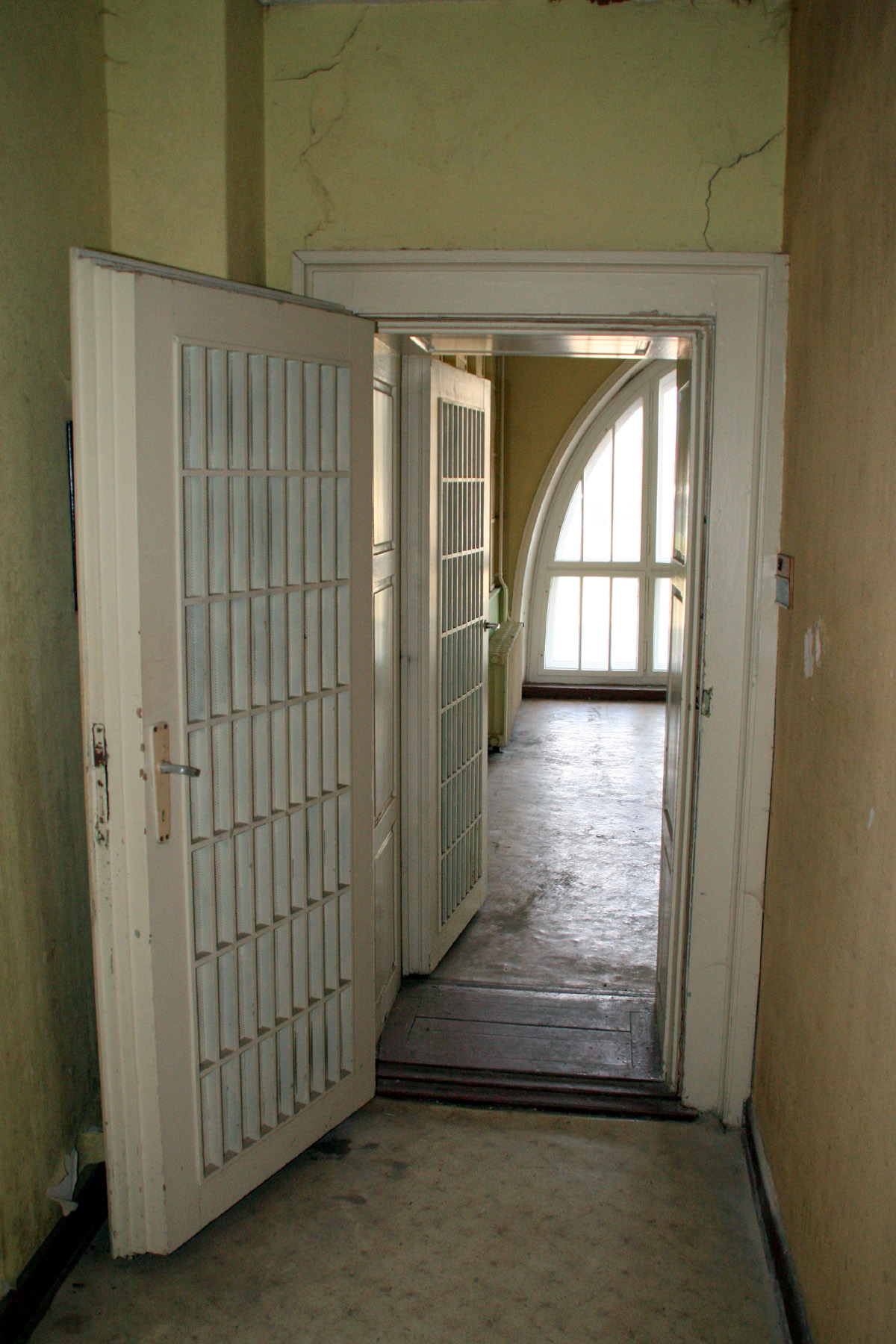
Soundproof doors in a broadcast center

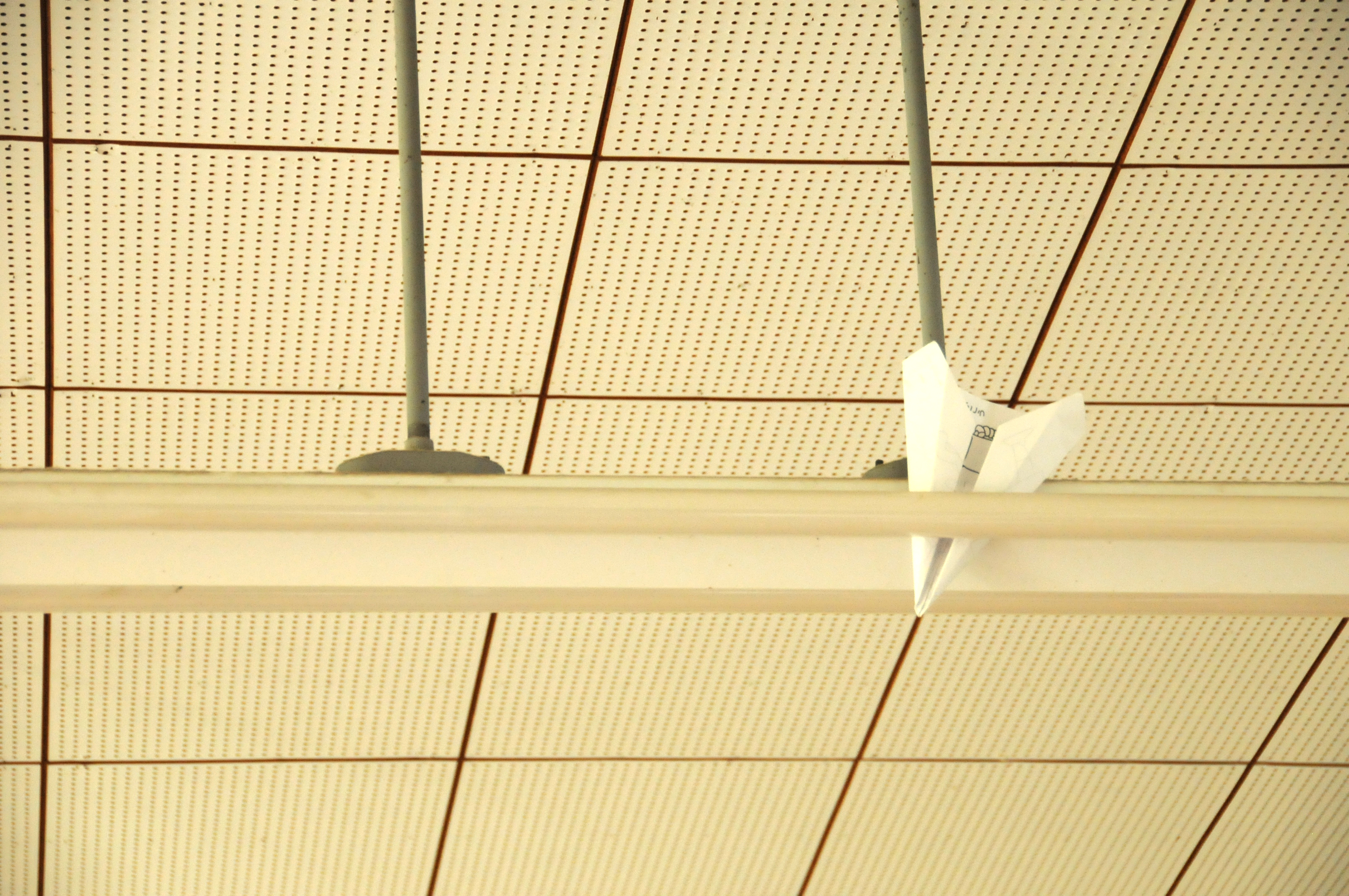
Acoustic ceiling tiles

Architectural acoustics noise control practices include interior sound reverberation reduction, inter-room noise transfer mitigation, and exterior building skin augmentation.

In the case of construction of new (or remodeled) apartments, condominiums, hospitals, and hotels, many states and cities have stringent building codes with requirements of acoustical analysis, in order to protect building occupants. With regard to exterior noise, the codes usually require measurement of the exterior acoustic environment in order to determine the performance standard required for exterior building skin design. The architect can work with the acoustical scientist to arrive at the best cost-effective means of creating a quiet interior (normally 45 dBA). The most important elements of design of the building skin are usually: glazing (glass thickness, double pane design etc.), perforated metal (used internally or externally), roof material, caulking standards, chimney baffles, exterior door design, mail slots, attic ventilation ports, and mounting of through-the-wall air conditioners.

Regarding sound generated inside the building, there are two principal types of transmission. Firstly, airborne sound travels through walls or floor and ceiling assemblies and can emanate from either human activities in adjacent living spaces or from mechanical noise within the building systems. Human activities might include voice, noise from amplified sound systems, or animal noise. Mechanical systems are elevator systems, boilers, refrigeration or air conditioning systems, generators and trash compactors. Aerodynamic sources include fans, pneumatics, and combustion. Noise control for aerodynamic sources include quiet air nozzles, pneumatic silencers and quiet fan technology. Since many mechanical sounds are inherently loud, the principal design element is to require the wall or ceiling assembly to meet certain performance standards, (typically Sound transmission class of 50), which allows considerable attenuation of the sound level reaching occupants.

The second type of interior sound is called Impact Insulation Class (IIC) transmission. This effect arises not from airborne transmission, but rather from the transmission of sound through the building itself. The most common perception of IIC noise is from the footfall of occupants in living spaces above. Low-frequency noise is transferred easily through the ground and buildings. This type of noise is more difficult to abate, but consideration must be given to isolating the floor assembly above or hanging the lower ceiling on resilient channel.

Both of the transmission effects noted above may emanate either from building occupants or from building mechanical systems such as elevators, plumbing systems or heating, ventilating and air conditioning units. In some cases, it is merely necessary to specify the best available quieting technology in selecting such building hardware. In other cases, shock mounting of systems to control vibration may be in order. In the case of plumbing systems, there are specific protocols developed, especially for water supply lines, to create isolation clamping of pipes within building walls. In the case of central air systems, it is important to baffle any ducts that could transmit sound between different building areas.

Designing special-purpose rooms has more exotic challenges, since these rooms may have requirements for unusual features such as concert performance, sound studio recording, and lecture halls. In these cases reverberation and reflection must be analyzed in order to not only quiet the rooms, but to prevent echo effects from occurring. In these situations special sound baffles and sound absorptive lining materials may be specified to dampen unwanted effects.

== Post-architectural solutions ==
Acoustical wall and ceiling panels are a common commercial and residential solution for noise control in already-constructed buildings. Acoustic panels may be constructed of a variety of materials, though commercial acoustic applications will frequently be composed of fiberglass or mineral wool-based acoustic substrates. For example, Mineral fiberboard is a commonly used acoustical substrate, and commercial thermal insulations, such as that used in the insulation of boiler tanks, are frequently repurposed for noise-controlling acoustic use based on their effectiveness at minimizing reverberations. The ideal acoustical panels are those without a face or finish material that could interfere with the performance of the acoustical infill, but aesthetic and safety concerns typically lead to fabric coverings or other finishing materials to minimize impedance. Panel finishings are occasionally made of a porous configuration of wood or metal.

The effectiveness of post-construction acoustic treatment is limited by the amount of space able to be allocated to acoustic treatment, and so on-site acoustical wall panels are frequently made to conform to the shape of the preexisting space. This is done by "framing" the perimeter track into shape, infilling the acoustical substrate and then stretching and tucking the fabric into the perimeter frame system. On-site wall panels can be constructed to work around door frames, baseboard, or any other intrusion. Large panels (generally greater than 50 feet) can be created on walls and ceilings with this method.

Double-glazed and thicker windows can also prevent sound transmission from the outdoors.

=== Industrial ===
Industrial noise is traditionally associated with manufacturing settings where industrial machinery produces intense sound levels, often upwards of 85 decibels. While this circumstance is the most dramatic, there are many other work environments where sound levels may lie in the range of 70 to 75 decibels, entirely composed of office equipment, music, public address systems, and even exterior noise intrusion. Either type of environment may result in noise health effects if the sound intensity and exposure time is too great.

In the case of industrial equipment, the most common techniques for noise protection of workers consist of shock mounting source equipment, creation of acrylic glass or other solid barriers, and provision of ear protection equipment. In certain cases the machinery itself can be redesigned to operate in a manner less prone to produce grating, grinding, frictional, or other motions that induce sound emissions. In recent years, Buy Quiet programs and initiatives have arisen in an effort to combat occupational noise exposures. These programs promote the purchase of quieter tools and equipment and encourage manufacturers to design quieter equipment.

In the case of more conventional office environments, the techniques in architectural acoustics discussed above may apply. Other solutions may involve researching the quietest models of office equipment, particularly printers and photocopy machines. Impact printers and other equipment were often fitted with "acoustic hoods", enclosures to reduce emitted noise. One source of annoying, if not loud, sound level emissions are lighting fixtures (notably older fluorescent globes). These fixtures can be retrofitted or analyzed to see whether over-illumination is present, a common office environment issue. If over-illumination is occurring, de-lamping or reduced light bank usage may apply. Photographers can quieten noisy still cameras on a film set using sound blimps.

=== Commercial ===
Reductions in cost of technology have allowed noise control technology to be used not only in performance facilities and recording studios, but also in noise-sensitive small businesses such as restaurants. Acoustically absorbent materials such as fiberglass duct liner, wood fiber panels and recycled denim jeans serve as artwork-bearing canvasses in environments in which aesthetics are important.

Using a combination of sound absorption materials, arrays of microphones and speakers, and a digital processor, a restaurant operator can use a tablet computer to selectively control noise levels at different places in the restaurant: the microphone arrays pick up sound and send it to the digital processor, which controls the speakers to output sound signals on command.

=== Residential ===
Post-construction residential acoustic treatment throughout the 20th century was only commonly the practice of music-listening enthusiasts. However, developments in home recording technology and fidelity have led to a drastic increase in the spread and popularity of residential acoustic treatment in the pursuit of home recording fidelity and accuracy. A large secondary market of homemade and home-use acoustic panels, bass trap, and similar constructed products has developed resulting from this demand, with many small companies and individuals wrapping industrial and commercial-grade insulations in fabric for use in home recording studios, theatre rooms, and music practice spaces.

== Urban planning ==
Communities may use zoning codes to isolate noisy urban activities from areas that should be protected from such unhealthy exposures and to establish noise standards in areas that may not be conducive to such isolation strategies. Because low-income neighborhoods are often at greater risk of noise pollution, the establishment of such zoning codes is often an environmental justice issue. Mixed-use areas present especially difficult conflicts that require special attention to the need to protect people from the harmful effects of noise pollution. Noise is generally one consideration in an environmental impact statement, if applicable (such as transportation system construction).

== See also ==
- Acoustic quieting
- Active noise control
- Buy Quiet
- Engineering Controls
- Flanking transmission
- Hearing protection device
- Hearing protection fit-testing
- Loud music
- Noise Abatement Society
- Noise reduction coefficient
- Noise regulation
- Noise, vibration, and harshness
- Rail squeal
- Safe-in-Sound Excellence in Hearing Loss Prevention Award
- Vibration isolation

General:

- Noise pollution
- Health effects from noise
