= Noise reduction coefficient =

Sound absorption performance of a material

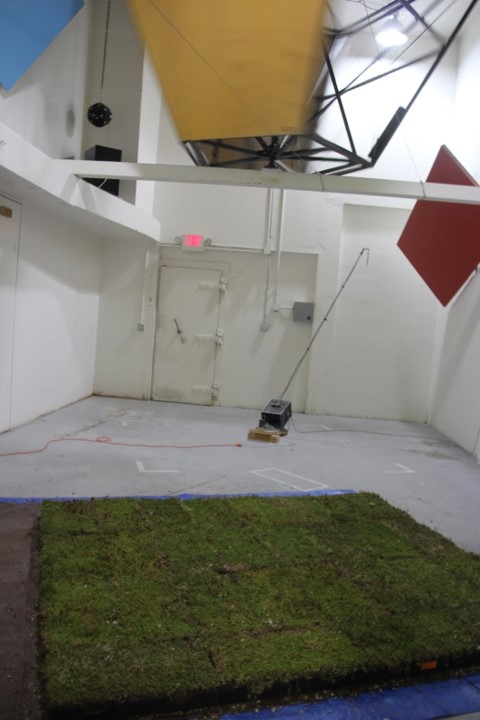
A reverberation chamber is used to test the sound absorption coefficients and NRC of a material.

The noise reduction coefficient (commonly abbreviated NRC) is a single-number rating intended to describe the average sound absorption performance of a material, derived from reverberation-room measurements. In common usage it is reported on a scale from 0.0 (very low absorption) to 1.0 (very high absorption), though values greater than 1.0 can occur in reverberation-room testing due to measurement effects such as edge diffraction and non-ideal diffuse-field conditions rather than “more than 100%” absorption.

NRC should not be confused with the sound transmission class (STC), a single-number rating derived from laboratory measurements of airborne sound transmission loss through building elements (for example walls, doors and windows). In general terms, STC relates to sound transmission loss through a construction element, while NRC relates to sound absorbed within a room by surfaces and treatments, such as to dampen echos and reverberations.

== Technical definition ==
The noise reduction coefficient is "a single-number rating, rounded to the nearest 0.05, of the sound absorption coefficients of a material for the four one-third octave bands at 250 Hz, 500 Hz, 1000 Hz and 2000 Hz". (note: it is commonly assumed that NRC is calculated based on the arithmetic average of the octave band absorption coefficients; however this is not in accordance with the ASTM C634-22 definition). The absorption coefficients of materials are commonly determined through use of standardized testing procedures, such as ASTM C423 that is used to evaluate the absorption of materials in eighteen one-third octave frequency bands with center frequencies ranging from 100 Hz to 5000 Hz. Absorption coefficients used to calculate NRC are commonly determined in reverberation rooms of qualified acoustical laboratory test facilities using samples of the particular materials of specified size (typically 72 square feet [6.7 m^{2}] in an 8 ft × 9 ft [2.4 m × 2.7 m] configuration) and appropriate mounting.

In reverberation-room methods, absorption coefficients are derived from changes in measured reverberation time between an empty room and the room with the test specimen present; NRC is then reported as a rounded average of the selected one-third octave band coefficients.

== History ==
Wallace Clement Sabine was the first scientist to study the sound-absorbing characteristics of materials in a scientifically rigorous manner. Paul Sabine, a distant cousin of Wallace, studied the repeatability of sound absorption coefficient measurements in reverberation chambers. Paul Sabine's work in the 1920s–1930s laid the groundwork for the ASTM C423 test methodology still used today.

Prior to the development of a standard procedure for material testing or reverberation chamber construction, data at low frequencies was highly unreliable and differed significantly from manufacturer to manufacturer. This is one of the primary reasons why the noise reduction coefficient historically did not include the value at 125 Hz (128 Hz at the time).

== Factors affecting noise reduction coefficient ==
=== Mounting type ===
The NRC is highly dependent on the type of mounting, which, if not specified, is usually a Type A mounting (ABPMA mounting #4) where the material is placed directly on the floor, wall, or ceiling.

Acoustical ceiling tiles are often tested in Type E400 mounting, which simulates a 16-inch-deep (410 mm) plenum. This deeper airspace typically boosts the low frequency performance of the tile, but may not impact the NRC rating (since the NRC does not include the 125 Hz octave band).

=== Sample size ===
There is potential for greater error or overemphasizing the acoustic efficacy of a material if tested sample sizes are smaller than the standardized 8-by-9-foot (2.4 m × 2.7 m) modules. The perimeter-to-area ratio has a significant effect on the overall sound absorption of a material, and may effect the NRC.

=== Thickness ===
Thicker samples of the same material often absorb more sound and are better at absorbing lower in frequency. This is because porous absorbers are most effective when placed at a distance of approximately one-quarter wavelength from a reflecting surface; increasing the material thickness extends this effective range to lower frequencies. For example, a 50 mm (2 in) thick porous absorber begins to lose effectiveness below approximately 500 Hz, while a 100 mm (4 in) thick sample of the same material provides useful absorption down to around 250 Hz.

Thicker materials also have larger surface area at the sides, resulting in increased sound absorption due to edge effects. In standardized testing, edge effects can cause the measured absorption coefficient to exceed 1.0, which is physically impossible for a flat, infinite surface but occurs because the sample edges contribute additional absorption area beyond the geometric face area of the specimen.

== Applications ==
NRC is most commonly used to rate general acoustical properties of acoustic ceiling tiles, baffles, banners, office screens, and acoustic wall panels. It is occasionally used to rate floor coverings.

NRC is intended to be a simplified acoustical rating of room construction and finish materials when the acoustical objectives of the space are less than sensitive. The NRC average is rounded to the nearest 0.05 due to a typical lab repeatability of ±0.05 for 2 standard deviations. Reproducibility between different labs is roughly three times higher at ±0.15 for 2 standard deviations. NRC is a useful rating for general purpose rooms where speech noise build-up is the major concern: lobbies, open offices, reception areas, etc. In certain applications, such as designs of music rehearsal rooms, performance spaces, and rooms employed for critical speech, it is usually more appropriate to consider the sound absorption coefficients at the individual one-third octave band frequencies, including those above and below the bands used to compute NRC.

When evaluating the NRC of similar materials, the following table can be used to approximate whether there's an aural difference:

Audible effect by change in NRC
Difference in coefficient	Effect for most situations
0.05–0.10	Little
0.10–0.20	Significant
0.20 and above	Considerable

== New standards ==
In ASTM C423 reporting, the sound absorption average (SAA) is another single-number rating derived from reverberation-room absorption coefficients. SAA is calculated from twelve one-third-octave-band coefficients from 200 Hz to 2500 Hz and is rounded to the nearest 0.01, whereas NRC is based on four one-third octave band coefficients (250, 500, 1000 and 2000 Hz) and is rounded to the nearest 0.05.

== See also ==
- Sound transmission class
- Acoustic foam
- Acoustics
- Architectural acoustics
- Construction
- Impact insulation class
- Noise
- Noise control
- Noise reduction
- Sound Reduction Index
- Soundproofing
