= Acoustic membrane =

Thin vibrating layer that produces sound

An acoustic membranes is an elastic membrane used to produce, transmit or regulate sound. In musical instruments such as drums, it is the drumhead that is vibrated to produce sound; in microphones and loudspeakers, it is diaphragms and cones that transfer sound waves to and from electricity to play music and facilitate communication. Acoustic membranes are also used to prevent sound—barium-free viscoelastic polymers such as Acoustiblok, at 1/8-to-1/4-inch thickness, or Tecsound 50 heavy-duty vinyl, block out their way with their energy-converting function turning over to heat to silence walls and floors. Ultrathin self-healing membranes composed of polyborodimethylsiloxane effectively absorb low-frequency noise (200–1000 Hz) with over 95% efficiency and restore their acoustic function once injured to open new doors to construction, automotive and aerospace applications.

== Mechanics ==
An acoustic membrane is generally idealized as a continuous two-dimensional elastic lamina, often in the shape of a disc with a non-zero uniform mass-per-area and a non-zero finite uniform elastic modulus throughout, with a fixed boundary.

The membrane's elasticity and inertia allows each material point to experience a non-zero restoring force when displaced from their respective equilibrium positions, and retain their momentum at equilibrium, respectively. This periodic variation of force and momentum of material points allows them to oscillate perpendicular to the membrane when subject to tension due to forces perpendicular to the membrane, leading to transverse mechanical waves. The frequency of oscillation depends on the elastic modulus, thickness, mass-per-area and area of, and tension within the membrane.

Membranes with greater mass-per-area tend to have transverse waves with lower frequencies; this due to that infinitesimal area elements within the membrane would have a greater mass, and thus, by Newton's second law of motion, would experience an acceleration of lower magnitude.

Membranes under greater tension when the displacement of all material points is zero tend to have transverse waves with higher frequencies; this is due to that at regions within the membrane where there is greater tension locally, material points experience a restoring force of greater magnitude, and hence return to their equilibrium positions within a shorter interval of time, which, in effect, decreases the time period of oscillation.

Membranes with a greater thickness have a tendency to have transverse waves of a higher frequency; this is due to that such membranes have a greater tendency to resist shear deformation along axes perpendicular to the membrane, given that the displacement of each material point is unchanged; this is a result of Hooke's law for shear deformation.

Oscillations with a higher amplitude do not necessarily have a greater frequency; this is a result of the absence of the amplitude in the expression for the period of oscillation in mass spring systems.

That the boundary of an acoustic membrane is fixed stationary with respect to an inertial frame of reference restricts the transverse waves that can exist on the membrane to those that have nodes at the boundary of the membrane, and causes reflection of waves off the boundary, leading to the formation of standing waves.

The transfer of mechanical energy from the membrane to the surrounding medium via elastic collisions of material points on the surface of the membrane with those on the adjacent surface of the surrounding medium (mostly a compressible fluid) in contact with the surface of the membrane is the primary mechanism of generation, and thus propagation of longitudinal mechanical waves in the surrounding medium.

== See also ==
- Membranophone
- Vibrations of a circular membrane
