= Acoustic panel =

Sound-absorbing board

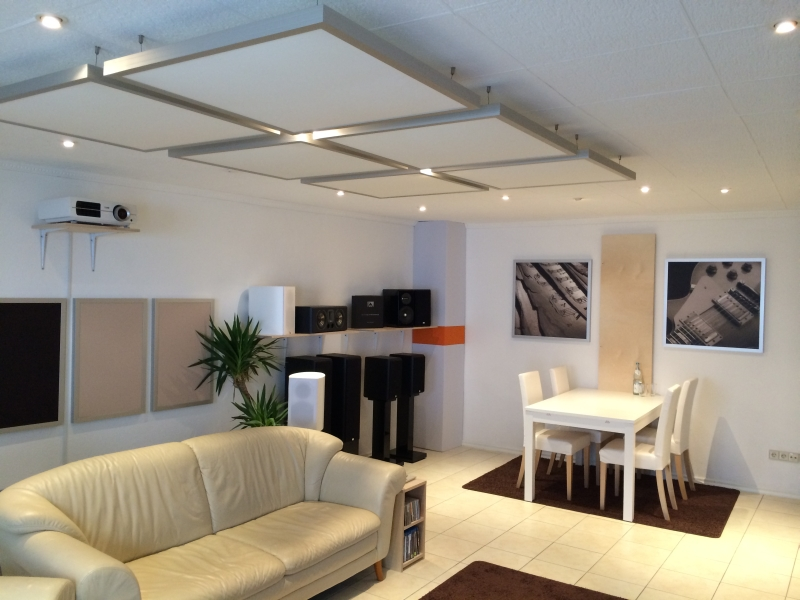
Acoustic panel installation in a hi-fi showroom, to reduce ceiling echo

Acoustic panels (also sound absorption panels, soundproof panels or sound panels) are sound-absorbing fabric-wrapped boards designed to control echo and reverberation in a room. Most commonly used to resolve speech intelligibility issues in commercial soundproofing treatments. Most panels are constructed with a wooden frame, filled with sound absorption material (mineral wool, fiber glass, cellulose, open cell foam, or a combination thereof) and wrapped with fabric.

An acoustic board is a board made from sound absorbing materials, designed to provide sound insulation. Between two outer walls sound absorbing material is inserted and the wall is porous. Thus, when sound passes through an acoustic board, the intensity of sound is decreased. The loss of sound energy is balanced by producing heat energy. They are used in auditoriums, halls, seminar rooms, libraries, courts and wherever sound insulation is needed. Acoustic boards are also used in speaker boxes.

== Performance rating ==
The sound absorption performance of acoustic panels is quantified by measuring the absorption coefficient across a range of frequencies. The standard laboratory method uses a reverberation room according to ISO 354, in which a specimen is placed in a large reverberant chamber and the resulting change in reverberation time is recorded at octave or third-octave band center frequencies from 125 Hz to 4000 Hz.

From these frequency-dependent values, a single-number rating can be derived. In North America the noise reduction coefficient (NRC) is calculated as the arithmetic mean of the absorption coefficients at 250, 500, 1000, and 2000 Hz, rounded to the nearest 0.05, in accordance with ASTM C423. The international equivalent is the weighted sound absorption coefficient a_{w} defined in ISO 11654, which assigns the panel to one of five sound absorption classes (A through E) based on a reference curve comparison.

Typical fabric-wrapped fiberglass panels with a 50 mm core achieve NRC values between 0.80 and 1.00, depending on the core density, thickness, and mounting method. Panels mounted with an air gap behind them generally show improved low-frequency absorption compared to panels mounted directly on a wall surface.

== See also ==
- Acoustics – Branch of physics involving mechanical waves
- Architectural acoustics – Science and engineering of achieving a good sound within a building
- Room acoustics – How sound behaves in an enclosed space
- Absorption (acoustics) – When an object takes in energy from sound waves instead of reflecting them
- Wall panel – Rigid material used as wall covering
