= Tapping machine =

A tapping machine is a device used to test the impact sound insulation of floors, for measurements of impact noise (noise of footsteps) in the field of building acoustics.

The standard tapping machine has five hammers placed in a line. Each hammer is lifted and dropped in turn, creating 10 impacts per second on the floor. In the room below or adjacent, a sound level meter is used to measure the sound level created by the impacts. Because the force and frequency of the impacts is known, the impact insulation provided by the floor can be determined from the sound level.
