= Soundproofing =

Methods to reduce sound pressure

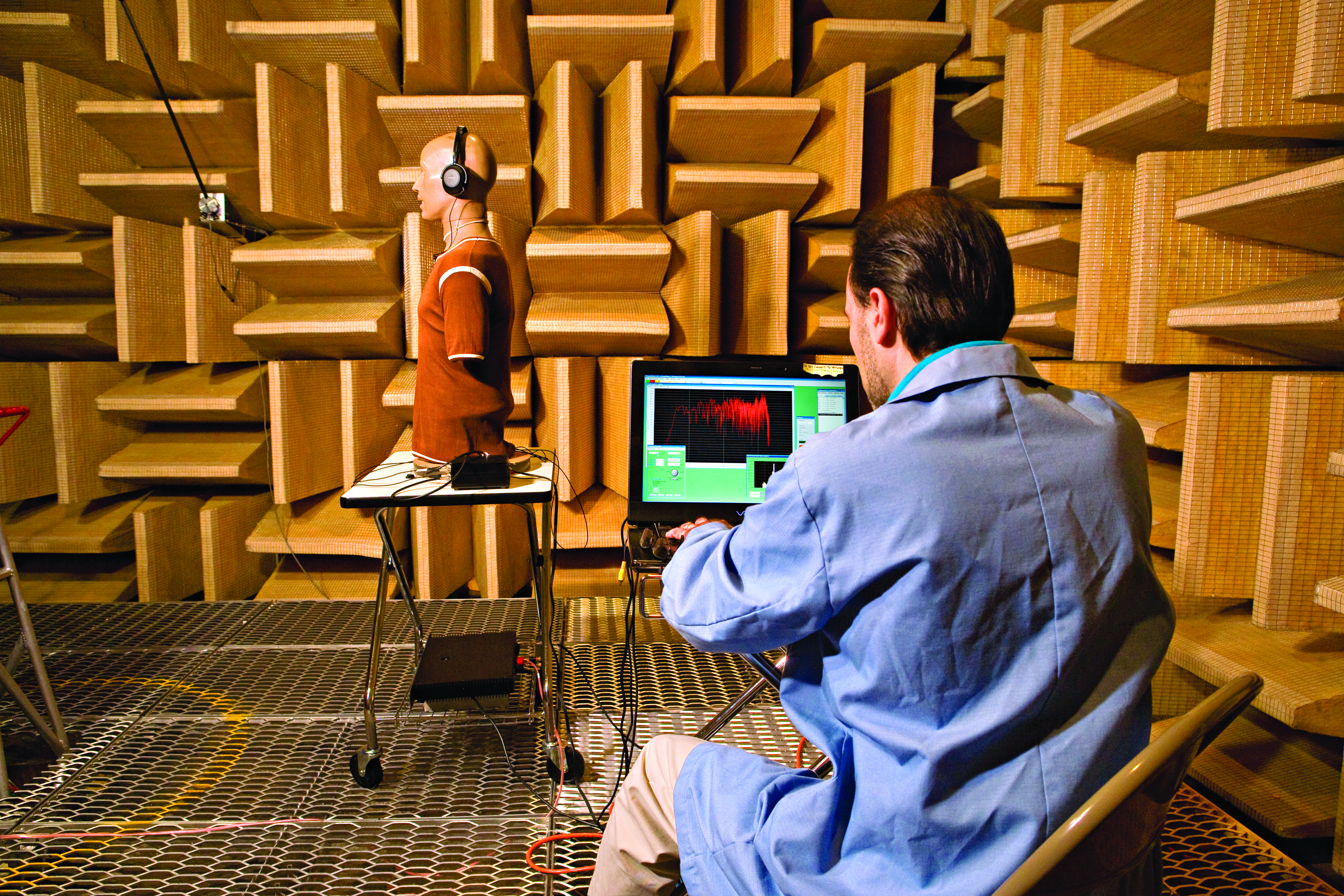
A pair of headphones being tested inside an anechoic chamber which provides soundproofing and absorption.

Soundproofing is any means of impeding sound propagation. There are several methods employed, including increasing the distance between the source and receiver, decoupling, using noise barriers to reflect or absorb the energy of the sound waves, using damping structures such as sound baffles for absorption, or using active anti-noise sound generators.

Acoustic quieting and noise control can be used to limit unwanted noise. Soundproofing can reduce the transmission of unwanted direct sound waves from the source to an involuntary listener through the use of distance and intervening objects in the sound path (see sound transmission class and sound reduction index).

Soundproofing can suppress unwanted indirect sound waves such as reflections that cause echoes and resonances that cause reverberation.

== Techniques ==
=== Absorption ===
Sound-absorbing material controls reverberant sound pressure levels within a cavity, enclosure or room. Synthetic absorption materials are porous, referring to open cell foam (acoustic foam, soundproof foam). Fibrous absorption material such as cellulose, mineral wool, fiberglass, sheep's wool, are more commonly used to deaden resonant frequencies within a cavity (wall, floor, or ceiling insulation), serving a dual purpose along with their thermal insulation properties. Both fibrous and porous absorption material are used to create acoustic panels, which absorb sound reflections in a room, improving speech intelligibility.

==== Porous absorbers ====
Porous absorbers, typically open-cell rubber foams or melamine sponges, absorb noise by friction within the cell structure. Porous open-cell foams are highly effective noise absorbers across a broad range of medium-high frequencies. Performance can be less impressive at lower frequencies. The exact absorption profile of a porous open-cell foam will be determined by a number of factors, including cell size, tortuosity, porosity, thickness, and density.

The absorption aspect in soundproofing should not be confused with sound-absorbing panels used in acoustic treatments. Absorption in this sense refers to reducing a resonating frequency in a cavity by installing insulation between walls, ceilings or floors. Acoustic panels can play a role in treatment, reducing reflections that make the overall sound in the source room louder, after walls, ceilings, and floors have been soundproofed.

==== Resonant absorbers ====
Resonant panels, Helmholtz resonators and other resonant absorbers work by damping a sound wave as they reflect it. Unlike porous absorbers, resonant absorbers are most effective at low-medium frequencies and the absorption of resonant absorbers is matched to a narrow frequency range.

=== Damping ===
Damping serves to reduce resonance in the room by absorption or redirection through reflection or diffusion. Absorption reduces the overall sound level, whereas redirection makes unwanted sound harmless or even beneficial by reducing coherence. Damping can be separately applied to reduce the acoustic resonance in the air or to reduce mechanical resonance in the structure of the room itself or things in the room.

=== Decoupling ===
Creating separation between a sound source and any form of adjoining mass, hindering the direct pathway for sound transfer.

=== Distance ===
The energy density of sound waves decreases as they become farther apart, so increasing the distance between the receiver and source results in a progressively lesser intensity of sound at the receiver. In a normal three-dimensional setting, with a point source and point receptor, the intensity of sound waves will be attenuated according to the inverse square of the distance from the source.

=== Mass ===
Adding dense material to treatment helps stop sound waves from exiting a source wall, ceiling or floor. Materials include mass-loaded vinyl (MLV), soundproof sheetrock or drywall, plywood, fibreboard, concrete or rubber. Different widths and densities in soundproofing material reduce sound within a variable frequency range.

=== Reflection ===
When sound waves hit a medium, the reflection of that sound is dependent on the dissimilarity of the material it comes in contact with. Sound hitting a concrete surface will result in a much different reflection than if the sound were to hit a softer medium such as fiberglass. In an outdoor environment, such as highway engineering, embankments or paneling are often used to reflect sound upwards into the sky.

=== Diffusion ===
If a specular reflection from a hard flat surface is giving a problematic echo, an acoustic diffuser may be applied to the surface. It will scatter sound in all directions.

=== Active noise control ===
In active noise control, a microphone is used to pick up the sound that is then analyzed by a computer; then, sound waves with opposite polarity (180° phase at all frequencies) are output through a speaker, causing destructive interference and canceling much of the noise.

== Applications ==
=== Residential ===
Residential sound programs aim to decrease or eliminate the effects of exterior noise. The main focus of a residential sound program in existing structures is the windows and doors. Solid wood doors are a better sound barrier than hollow doors. Curtains can be used to dampen sound, either through the use of heavy materials or through the use of air chambers known as honeycombs. Single-, double- and triple-honeycomb designs achieve relatively greater degrees of sound damping. The primary soundproofing limit of curtains is the lack of a seal at the edge of the curtain, although this may be alleviated with the use of sealing features, such as hook-and-loop fasteners, adhesive, magnets, or other materials. The thickness of glass will play a role when diagnosing sound leakage. Double-pane windows achieve somewhat greater sound insulation than single-pane windows when well-sealed into the opening of the window frame and wall.

However, standard thermal double glazing often performs poorly against low-frequency traffic noise due to resonance. Laminated acoustic glass, which incorporates a vibration-damping interlayer, is used to improve the Outdoor-Indoor Transmission Class (OITC) rating, a metric specifically designed to measure insulation against transportation noise sources (aircraft, trains, and automobiles)

Significant noise reduction can also be achieved by installing a second interior window. In this case, the exterior window remains in place while a slider or hung window is installed within the same wall openings.

In the US, the FAA offers sound-reducing measures for homes that fall within a noise contour where the average sound level is 65 dB SPL or greater. It is part of its Residential Sound Insulation Program. The program provides solid-core wood entry doors, plus windows and storm doors.

=== Ceilings ===
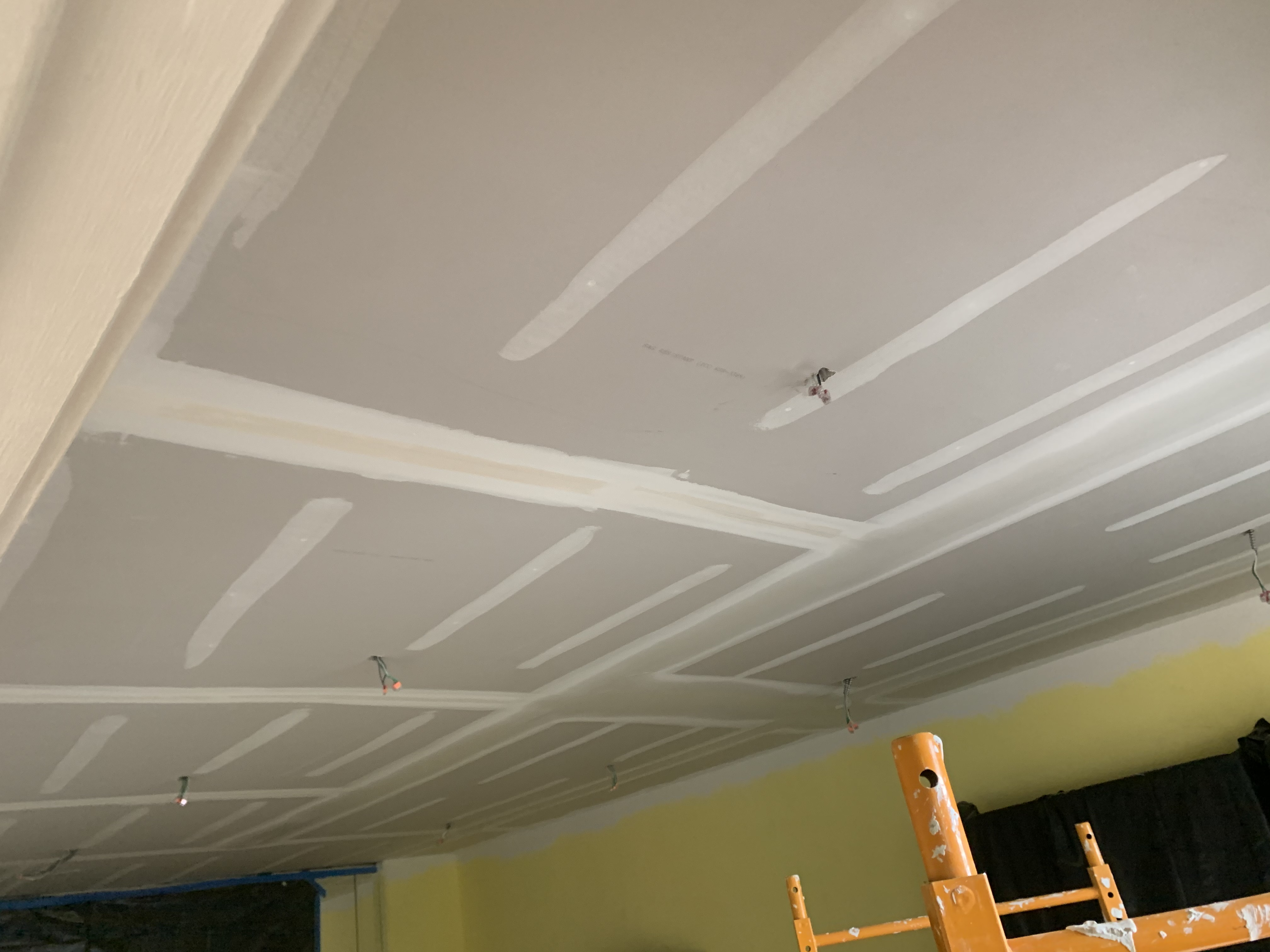
Apartment ceiling soundproofing

Sealing gaps and cracks around electrical wiring, water pipes and ductwork using acoustical caulk or spray foam will significantly reduce unwanted noise as a preliminary step for ceiling soundproofing. Acoustical caulk should be used along the perimeter of the wall and around all fixtures and duct registers to further seal the treatment. Mineral wool insulation is most commonly used in soundproofing for its density and low cost compared to other soundproofing materials. Spray foam insulation should only be used to fill gaps and cracks or as a 1-2 inch layer before installing mineral wool. Cured spray foam and other closed-cell foam can be a sound conductor. Spray foam is not porous enough to absorb sound and is also not dense enough to stop sound.

An effective method to reduce impact noise is the "resilient isolation channel". The channels decouple the drywall from the joists, reducing the transfer of vibration.

=== Walls ===
Barring an airtight vacuum, mass is the only way to stop sound. Mass refers to drywall, plywood, or concrete. MLV is used to dampen or weaken sound waves between layers of mass. Use of a viscoelastic damping compound or MLV converts sound waves into heat, weakening the waves before they reach the next layer of mass. It is important to use multiple layers of mass, in different widths and densities, to optimize any given soundproofing treatment. Installing soundproof drywall is recommended for its higher sound transmission class (STC) value. Soundproof drywall in combination with a viscoelastic compound may achieve a noise reduction of STC 60+.

Walls are filled with mineral wool insulation. Depending on the desired level of treatment, two layers of insulation may be required. Outlets, light switches, and electrical boxes are weak points in any given soundproofing treatment. Electrical boxes should be wrapped in clay or putty and backed with MLV. After switch plates, outlet covers and lights are installed, acoustic caulking should be applied around the perimeter of the plates or fixtures.

=== Floors ===
Decoupling between the joist and subfloor plywood using neoprene joist tape or U-shaped rubber spacers helps create soundproof flooring. An additional layer of plywood can be installed with a viscoelastic compound. MLV, in combination with open-cell rubber or a closed-cell foam floor underlayment, will further reduce sound transmission. After applying these techniques, hardwood flooring or carpeting can be installed. Additional area rugs and furniture will help reduce unwanted reflection within the room.

=== Room within a room ===
A room within a room (RWAR) is one method of isolating sound and preventing it from transmitting to the outside world, where it may be undesirable.

Most sound transfer from a room to the outside occurs through mechanical as opposed to airborne means. The vibration passes directly through the brick, woodwork and other solid structural elements. When it meets with an element such as a wall, ceiling, floor or window, which acts as a sounding board, the vibration is amplified and heard in the second space. A mechanical transmission is much faster, more efficient and more readily amplified than an airborne transmission of the same initial strength.

The use of acoustic foam and other absorbent means is less effective against this transmitted vibration. The transmission can be stopped by breaking the connection between the room that contains the noise source and the outside world. This is called acoustic decoupling.

=== Commercial ===
Restaurants, schools, office businesses, and healthcare facilities use architectural acoustics to reduce noise for their customers. In the United States, OSHA has requirements regulating the length of exposure of workers to certain levels of noise.

For educators and students, improving the sound quality of an environment will subsequently improve student learning, concentration, and teacher-student communication. In 2014, a research study conducted by Applied Science revealed 86% of students perceived their instructors more intelligibly, while 66% of students reported experiencing higher concentration levels after sound-absorbing materials were incorporated into the classroom.

=== Automotive ===
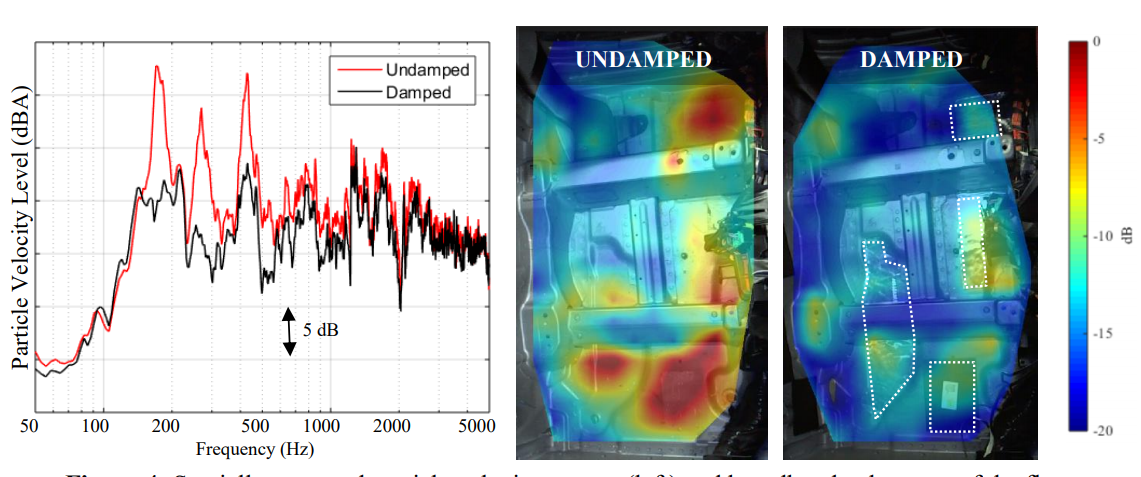
Spatially averaged particle velocity spectra (left) and broadband colormaps of a car floor without (middle) and with (right) a damping treatment

Automotive soundproofing aims to decrease or eliminate the effects of exterior noise, primarily engine, exhaust and tire noise across a wide frequency range. A panel-damping material is fitted, which reduces the vibration of the vehicle's body panels when they are excited by one of the many high-energy sound sources in play when the vehicle is in use. There are many complex noises created within vehicles that change with the driving environment and speed at which the vehicle travels. Significant noise reductions of up to 8 dB can be achieved by installing a combination of different types of materials.

The automotive environment limits the thickness of materials that can be used, but combinations of dampers, barriers, and absorbers are common. Common materials include felt, foam, polyester, and polypropylene blend materials. Waterproofing may be necessary depending on the materials used. Acoustic foam can be applied in different areas of a vehicle during manufacture to reduce cabin noise. Foams also have cost and performance advantages in installation since foam material can expand and fill cavities after application and also prevent leaks and some gases from entering the vehicle. Vehicle soundproofing can reduce wind, engine, road, and tire noise. Vehicle soundproofing can reduce sound inside a vehicle from five to 20 decibels.

Surface-damping materials are very effective at reducing structure-borne noise. Passive damping materials have been used since the early 1960s in the aerospace industry. Over the years, advances in material manufacturing and the development of more efficient analytical and experimental tools to characterize complex dynamic behaviors enabled the expansion of the usage of these materials to the automotive industry. Nowadays, multiple viscoelastic damping pads are usually attached to the body in order to attenuate higher-order structural panel modes that significantly contribute to the overall noise level inside the cabin. Traditionally, experimental techniques are used to optimize the size and location of damping treatments. In particular, laser vibrometer-type tests are often conducted on the body-in-white structures, enabling the fast acquisition of a large number of measurement points with a good spatial resolution. However, testing a complete vehicle is mostly infeasible, requiring evaluation of every subsystem individually, hence limiting the usability of this technology in a fast and efficient way. Alternatively, structural vibrations can also be acoustically measured using particle velocity sensors located near a vibrating structure. Several studies have revealed the potential of particle velocity sensors for characterizing structural vibrations, which accelerates the entire testing process when combined with scanning techniques.

==== Noise barriers ====
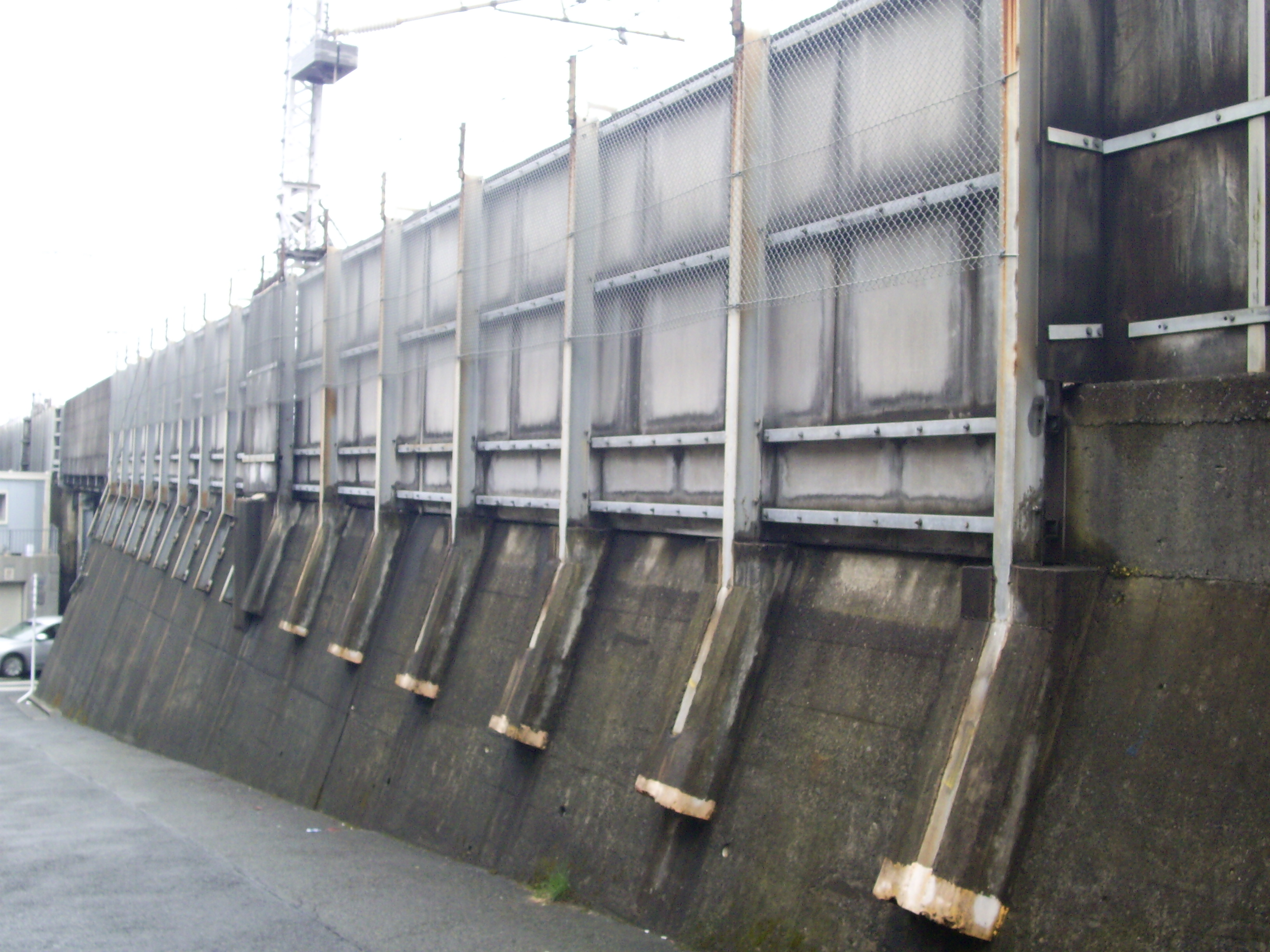
Noise barrier alongside a railway line in Japan

Since the early 1970s, it has become common practice in the United States and other industrialized countries to engineer noise barriers along major highways to protect adjacent residents from intruding roadway noise. The Federal Highway Administration (FHWA), in conjunction with the State Highway Administration (SHA), adopted Federal Regulation (23 CFR 772) requiring each state to adopt its own policy regarding the abatement of highway traffic noise. Engineering techniques have been developed to predict an effective geometry for the noise barrier design in a particular real-world situation. Noise barriers may be constructed of wood, masonry, earth or a combination thereof.

== See also ==
- Acoustic transmission
- Acoustiblok
- Flanking transmission
- Hearing test
- Noise pollution
- Noise regulation
- Recording studio
