= Acoustiblok =

Acoustiblok is a sound attenuation material that was introduced in 1999. It is implemented in new construction and remodeling projects. It is designed to be applied behind drywall and other finishing materials.

== Physical properties ==
Acoustiblok is a mass-loaded vinyl sound isolation product. It is a dense yet flexible material that comes in two sizes; 16oz. and 32oz.

- 16oz Acoustiblok is 1/8" thick and has a surface mass density of 1 lb/ft^{2}.
- 32oz Acoustiblok is 1/4" thick and has a surface mass density of 2 lb/ft^{2}.

The manufacturer claims it is barium-free, has high UV resistance and has no fungal or algal growth.

== Performance data ==
The ability of a partition to block the transmission of airborne sound can be described by a single number rating of the Sound Transmission Class (STC).

- The 16oz version of Acoustiblok meets an STC of 26.
- The 32oz version of Acoustiblok meets an STC of 32.
- Adding one layer of Acoustiblok to a standard metal stud gypsum board interior wall has the potential to increase its STC rating.
- Double steel stud partition walls, faced with single layers of drywall and containing fiber-glass insulation and Acoustiblok, can achieve an STC of up to 66, according to the manufacturer.

STC is calculated using a range of frequencies similar to the human voice; attenuation in higher and lower ranges should be estimated from the Sound Transmission Loss graphs provided with standard STC reports.

Test procedures and the formula for calculation of STC values are defined in ASTM Standards E90-02 and E413-87.

== Construction applications ==
New Construction, Remodel/Renovation

Acoustiblok material is typically installed in partition walls and floor/ceiling assemblies when they are stripped to the studs.

== Classification ==
Acoustiblok is qualified for use in commercial and institutional construction by its UL Classification file, found under Fire Tests of Building Construction and Materials. This Classification includes use in wall designs of the U300, U400, and V400 series and floor-ceiling constructions of the L500 series, as specified in ANSI/UL 263 Fire Resistance Ratings. Ratings of 1 and 2 hours can be obtained, depending on the specific partition design.
