= Sound transmission class =

Measurement of sound permeability

Sound Transmission Class (STC) is an integer rating of how well a building partition attenuates airborne sound. In the US, it is widely used to rate interior partitions, ceilings, floors, doors, windows and exterior wall configurations. Outside the US, the ISO Sound Reduction Index (SRI) is used. The STC rating very roughly reflects the decibel reduction of noise that a partition can provide. The STC is useful for evaluating annoyance due to speech sounds, but not music or machinery noise as these sources contain more low frequency energy than speech.

There are many ways to improve the sound transmission class of a partition, though the two most basic principles are adding mass and increasing the overall thickness. In general, the sound transmission class of a double wythe wall (e.g. two 4-inch-thick [100 mm] block walls separated by a 2-inch [51 mm] airspace) is greater than a single wall of equivalent mass (e.g. homogeneous 8-inch [200 mm] block wall).

== Definition ==
The STC or sound transmission class is a single number method of rating how well wall partitions reduce sound transmission. The STC provides a standardized way to compare products such as doors and windows made by competing manufacturers. A higher number indicates more effective sound insulation than a lower number. The STC is a standardized rating provided by ASTM E413 based on laboratory measurements performed in accordance with ASRM E90. ASTM E413 can also be used to determine similar ratings from field measurements performed in accordance with ASTM E336.

Sound Isolation and Sound Insulation are used interchangeably, though the term "Insulation" is preferred outside the US. The term "sound proofing" is typically avoided in architectural acoustics as it is a misnomer and connotes inaudibility.

== Subjective correlation ==
Through research, acousticians have developed tables that pair a given STC rating with a subjective experience. The table below is used to determine the degree of sound isolation provided by typical multi-family construction. Generally, a difference of one or two STC points between similar constructions is subjectively insignificant.

STCs by audio distinguishability
STC	What can be heard
25	Normal speech can be understood
30	Loud speech can be understood
35	Loud speech audible but not intelligible
40	Loud speech audible as a murmur
45	Loud speech heard but not audible
50	Loud sounds faintly heard
60+	Good soundproofing; most sounds do not disturb neighboring residents.

Tables like the one above are highly dependent on the background noise levels in the receiving room: the louder the background noise, the greater the perceived sound isolation.

== Rating methodology ==
=== Historical ===
Prior to the STC rating, the sound isolation performance of a partition was measured and reported as the average transmission loss of over the frequency range 128 to 4096 Hz or 256 to 1021 Hz. This method is valuable at comparing homogeneous partitions that follow the mass law, but can be misleading when comparing complex or multi-leaf walls.

In 1961, the ASTM International Standards Organization adopted E90-61T, which served as the basis for the STC method used today. The STC standard curve is based on European studies of multi-family residential construction, and closely resembles the sound isolation performance of a 9-inch-thick (230 mm) brick wall.

=== Current ===
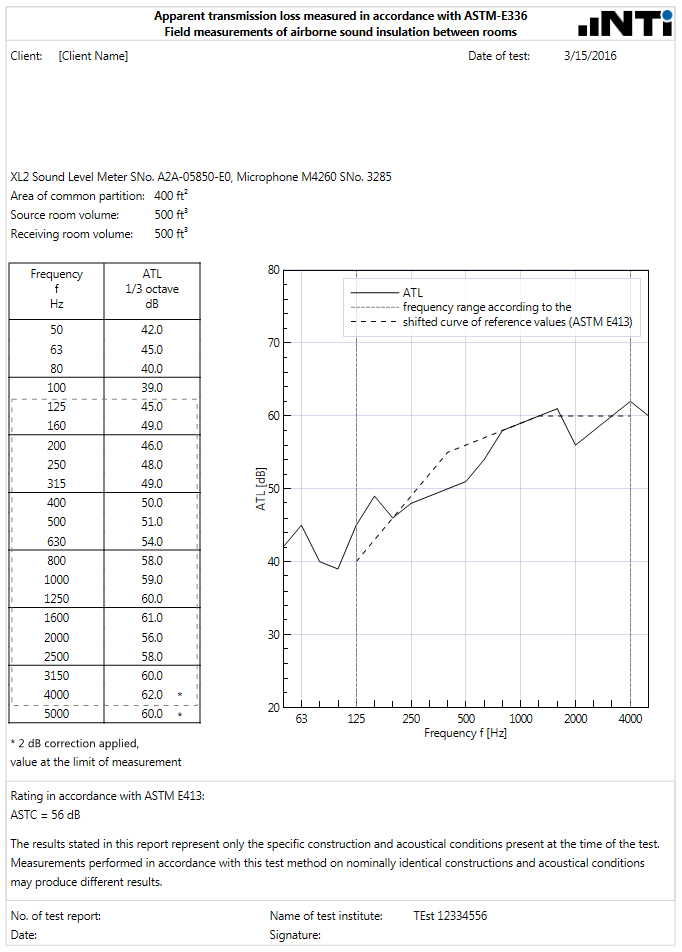
Sound Transmission Class Report Sample from NTi Audio showing Transmission Loss in the sixteen standard frequencies

The STC number is derived from sound attenuation values tested at sixteen standard frequencies from 125 Hz to 4000 Hz. These Transmission Loss values are then plotted on a sound pressure level graph and the resulting curve is compared to a standard reference contour provided by the ASTM.

Sound isolation metrics, such as the STC, are measured in specially-isolated and designed laboratory test chambers. There are nearly infinite field conditions that will affect sound isolation on site when designing building partitions and enclosures.

== Factors affecting sound transmission class ==
=== Acoustic medium ===
Sound travels through both the air and structure, and both paths must be considered when designing sound isolating walls and ceilings. To eliminate air borne sound all air paths between the areas must be eliminated. This is achieved by making seams airtight and closing all sound leaks. To eliminate structure-borne noise one must create isolation systems that reduce mechanical connections between those structures.

=== Mass ===
Adding mass to a partition reduces the transmission of sound. This is often achieved by adding additional layers of gypsum. It is preferable to have non symmetrical leaves, for example with different thickness gypsum. The effect of adding multiple layers of gypsum wallboard to a frame also varies depending on the framing type and configuration. Doubling the mass of a partition does not double the STC, as the STC is calculated from a non-linear decibel sound transmission loss measurement. So, whereas installing an additional layer of gypsum wallboard to a light-gauge (25-ga. or lighter) steel stud partition will result in about a 5 STC-point increase, doing the same on single wood or single heavy-gauge steel will result in only 2 to 3 additional STC points. Adding a second additional layer (to the already three-layer system) does not result in as drastic an STC change as the first additional layer. The effect of additional gypsum wallboard layers on double- and staggered-stud partitions is similar to that of light-gauge steel partitions.

Due to increased mass, poured concrete and concrete blocks typically achieve higher STC values (in the mid STC 40s to the mid STC 50s) than equally thick framed walls. However the additional weight, added complexity of construction, and poor thermal insulation tend to limit masonry wall partitions as a viable sound isolation solution in many building construction projects.

In recent years, gypsum board manufacturers have started to offer lightweight drywall board: Normal-weight gypsum has a nominal density of 43 pounds per cubic foot (690 kg/m^{3}), and lightweight drywall has a nominal density of 36 pounds per cubic foot (580 kg/m^{3}). This does not have a large effect on the STC rating, though lightweight gypsum can significantly degrade the low frequency performance of a partition as compared to normal weight gypsum.

=== Sound absorption ===
Sound absorption entails converting acoustical energy into other forms, usually heat.

Adding absorptive materials to the interior surfaces of rooms, for example fabric-faced fiberglass panels and thick curtains, will result in a decrease of reverberated sound energy within the room. However, absorptive interior surface treatments of this kind do not significantly improve the sound transmission class. Installing absorptive insulation, for example fiberglass batts and blow-in cellulose, into the wall or ceiling cavities does increase the sound transmission class significantly. The presence of insulation in single 2x4 wood stud framing spaced 16 inches (410 mm) on-center results in only a few STC points. This is because a wall with 2x4 wood stud framing spaced 16 inches develops significant resonances which are not mitigated by the cavity insulation. In contrast, adding standard fiberglass insulation to an otherwise empty cavity in light-gauge (25-gauge or lighter) steel stud partitions can result in a nearly 10 STC-point improvement.

Other studies have shown that fibrous insulation materials, such as mineral wool, can increase the STC by 5 to 8 points.

=== Stiffness ===
The effect of stiffness on sound isolation can relate to either the material stiffness of the sound isolating material or the stiffness caused by framing methods.

A key phenomenon related to material stiffness is the coincidence effect, which occurs when the wavelength of a bending wave in the partition matches the projected wavelength of the incident sound wave. At and above the critical frequency, the partition becomes nearly transparent to sound, causing a significant dip in transmission loss. Stiffer, thinner materials tend to have higher critical frequencies, while heavier, more flexible panels have lower critical frequencies. For standard 16 mm (5/8 in) gypsum board, the critical frequency is approximately 2500 Hz, which falls within the STC rating range and influences the overall STC value.

==== Framing methods ====
Structurally decoupling the gypsum wallboard panels from the partition framing can result in a large increase in sound isolation when installed correctly. Examples of structural decoupling in building construction include resilient channels, sound isolation clips and hat channels, and staggered- or double-stud framing. The STC results of decoupling in wall and ceiling assemblies varies significantly depending on the framing type, air cavity volume, and decoupling material type. Great care must be taken in each type of decoupled partition construction, as any fastener that becomes mechanically (rigidly) coupled to the framing can undermine the decoupling and result in drastically lower sound isolation results.

When two leaves are rigidly tied or coupled by a stud, the sound isolation of the system depends on the stiffness of the stud. Light-gauge (25-gauge or lighter) provides better sound isolation than 16-20-gauge steel, and noticeably better performance than wood studs. When heavy gauge steel or wood studs are spaced 16 inches (410 mm) on center, additional resonances form which further lower the sound isolation performance of a partition. For typical gypsum stud walls, this resonance occurs in the 100–160 Hz region and is thought to be a hybrid of the mass-air-mass resonance and a bending mode resonance caused when a plate is closely supported by stiff members.

Single metal stud partitions are more effective than single wood stud partitions, and have been shown to increase the STC rating by up to 10 points. However, there is little difference between metal and wood studs when used in double stud partitions. Double stud partitions have a higher STC than single stud.

In certain assemblies, increasing the stud spacing from 16 to 24 inches (410–610 mm) increases the STC rating by 2 to 3 points.

=== Damping ===
Though the terms sound absorption and damping are often interchangeable when discussing room acoustics, acousticians define these as two distinct properties of sound-isolating walls.

Several gypsum manufacturers offer specialty products which use constrained-layer damping, which is a form of viscous damping. Damping generally increases the sound isolation of partitions, particularly at mid-and-high frequencies.

Damping is also used to improve the sound isolation performance of glazing assemblies. Laminated glazing, which consists of a Polyvinyl butyral (or PVB) inter-layer, performs better acoustically than a non-laminated glass of equivalent thickness.

=== Sound leakage ===
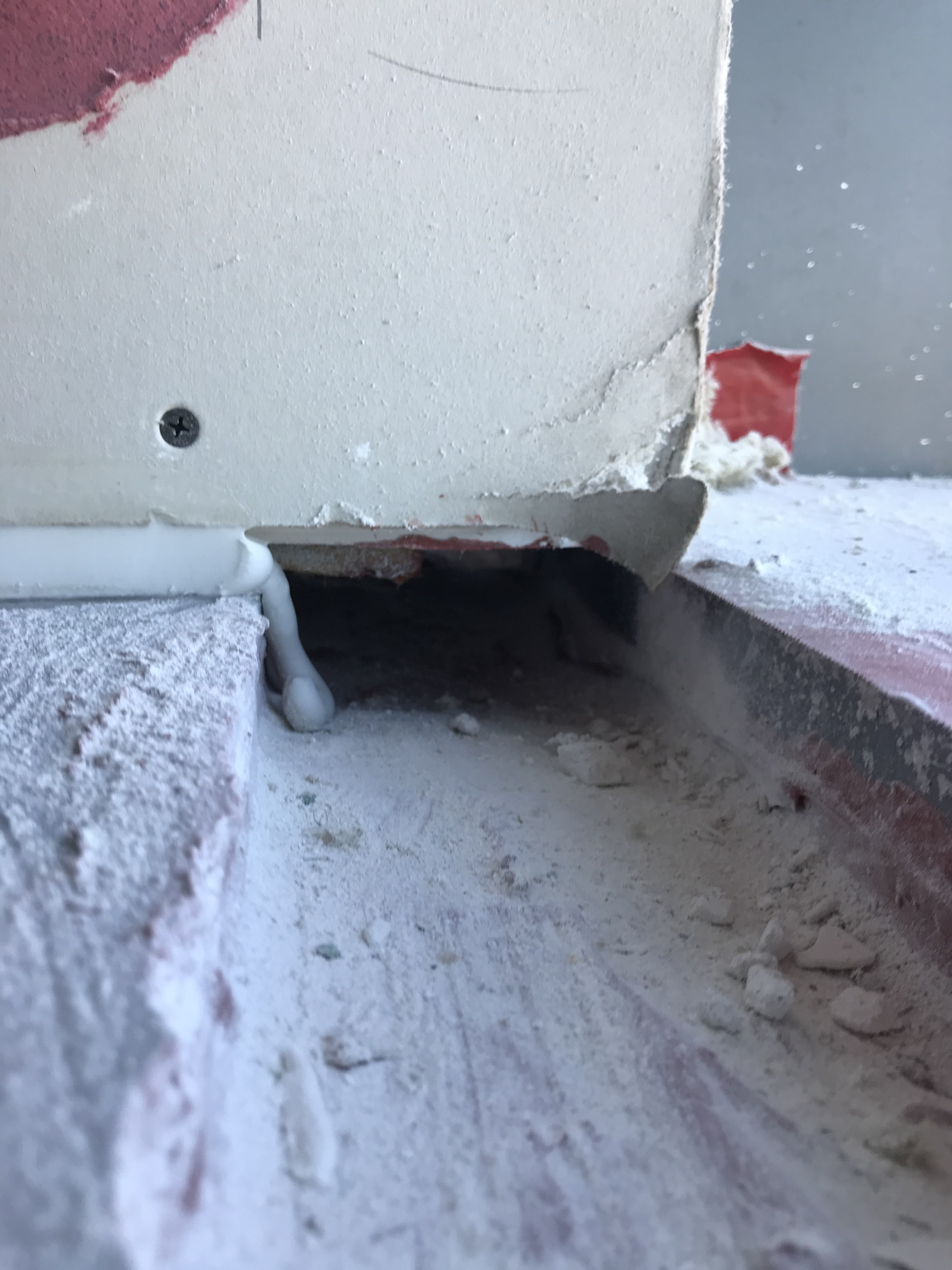
A small gap in the wall can greatly reduce the STC rating. This wall did not receive a full perimeter seal.

All holes and gaps should be filled and the enclosure hermetically sealed for sound isolation to be effective. The table below illustrates sound proofing test results from a wall partition that has a theoretical maximum loss of 40 dB from one room to the next and a partition area of 10 meters squared. Even small open gaps and holes in the partition have a disproportionate reduction in sound proofing. A 5% opening in the partition, which offers unrestricted sound transmission from one room to the next, caused the transmission loss to reduce from 40 dB to 13 dB. A 0.1% open area will reduce the transmission loss from 40 dB to 30 dB, which is typical of walls where caulking has not been applied effectively Partitions that are inadequately sealed and contain back-to-back electrical boxes, untreated recessed lighting and unsealed pipes offer flanking paths for sound and significant leakage.

Acoustic joint tapes and caulking have been used to improve sound isolation since the early 1930s. Although the applications of tapes was largely limited to defense and industrial applications such as naval vessels and aircraft in the past, recent research has proven the effectiveness of sealing gaps and thereby improving the sound isolation performance of a partition.

Sound diminution by percentage openness of barrier
Transmission loss	% of area open
13 dB	5% open
17 dB	2% open
20 dB	1% open
23 dB	0.5% open
27 dB	0.2% open
30 dB	0.1% open
33 dB	0.05% open
37 dB	0.02% open
39.5 dB	Practical maximum loss
40 dB	Theoretical maximum loss

=== Flanking ===
Building codes typically allow for a 5-point tolerance between the lab-tested and field-measured STC rating; however, studies have shown that even in well-built and sealed installations the difference between the lab and field rating is highly dependent on the type of assembly.

== Special variations of STC ==
By nature, the STC rating is derived from lab testing under ideal conditions. There are other versions of the STC rating to account for real-world conditions.

=== Composite STC ===
The net sound isolation performance of a partition containing multiple sound isolating elements such as doors, windows, etc.

=== Apparent Sound Transmission Class (ASTC) ===
The sound isolation performance of a partition measured in the field according to ASTM E336, normalized to account for different room finishes and the area of the tested partition (i.e. compare the same wall measured in a bare living room and an acoustically dry recording booth).

=== Normalized Noise Isolation Class (NNIC) ===
The sound isolation performance of a partition measured in the field according to ASTM E336, normalized to account for the reverberation time in the room.

=== Noise Isolation Class (NIC) ===
The sound isolation performance of a partition measured in the field according to ASTM E336, not normalized to the room conditions of the test.

=== Field Sound Transmission Class (FSTC) ===
The sound isolation performance of a specific elements in a partition, as measured in the field and achieved by suppressing the effects of sound flanking paths. This can be useful for measuring walls with doors, when you are interested in removing the influence of the door on the measured field STC. The FSTC testing method was historically prescribed by ASTM E336, however the latest version of this standard does not include FSTC.

=== Door Sound Transmission Class (DTC) ===
The sound isolation performance of doors when measured according to ASTM E2964.

== Legal and practical requirements ==
Section 1206 of International Building Code 2021 states that separation between dwelling units and public and service areas must achieve STC 50 where tested in accordance with ASTM E90, or NNIC 45 if field tested in accordance with ASTM E336. However, not all jurisdictions use the IBC for their building or municipal code.

== Common partition STC ==
Interior walls with 1 sheet of 1/2-inch (13 mm) gypsum wallboard (drywall) on either side of 2x4 (1 1/2 in × 3 1/2 in or 38 mm × 89 mm) wood studs spaced 16 inches (410 mm) on-center with no fiberglass insulation filling each stud cavity have an STC of about 33. When asked to rate their acoustical performance, people often describe these walls as "paper thin." They offer little in the way of privacy. Double stud partition walls are typically constructed with varying gypsum wallboard panel layers attached to both sides of double 2x4 wood studs spaced 16 inches on-center and separated by a 1-inch (25 mm) airspace. These walls vary in sound isolation performance from the mid STC-40s into the high STC-60s depending on the presence of insulation and the gypsum wallboard type and quantity. Commercial buildings are typically constructed using steel studs of varying widths, gauges, and on-center spacings. Each of these framing characteristics have an effect on the sound isolation of the partition to varying degrees.

STCs by partition type
STC	Partition type
27	Single pane glass window (typical value) (dual-pane glass window range is 26–32)"STC Ratings".
33	Single layer of 1/2-inch (13 mm) drywall on each side, wood studs, no insulation (typical interior wall)
39	Single layer of 1/2-inch (13 mm) drywall on each side, wood studs, fiberglass insulation
44	4-inch (100 mm) hollow CMU (concrete masonry unit)
45	Double layer of 1/2-inch (13 mm) drywall on each side, wood studs, batt insulation in wall
46	Single layer of 1/2-inch (13 mm) drywall, glued to 6-inch (150 mm) lightweight concrete block wall, painted both sides
46	6-inch (150 mm) hollow CMU (concrete masonry unit)
48	8-inch (200 mm) hollow CMU (concrete masonry unit)
50	10-inch (250 mm) hollow CMU (concrete masonry unit)
52	8-inch (200 mm) hollow CMU (concrete masonry unit) with 2-inch (51 mm) Z-bars and 1/2-inch (13 mm) drywall on each side
54	Single layer of 1/2-inch (13 mm) drywall, glued to 8-inch (200 mm) dense concrete block wall, painted both sides
54	8-inch (200 mm) hollow CMU (concrete masonry unit) with 1 1/2-inch (38 mm) wood furring, 1 1/2-inch fiberglass insulation and 1/2-inch (13 mm) drywall on each side
55	Double layer of 1/2-inch (13 mm) drywall on each side, on staggered wood stud wall, batt insulation in wall
59	Double layer of 1/2-inch (13 mm) drywall on each side, on wood stud wall, resilient channels on one side, batt insulation
63	Double layer of 1/2-inch (13 mm) drywall on each side, on double wood/metal stud walls (spaced 1 inch [25 mm] apart), double batt insulation
64	8-inch (200 mm) hollow CMU (concrete masonry unit) with 3-inch (76 mm) steel studs, fiberglass insulation and 1/2-inch (13 mm) drywall on each side
72	8-inch (200 mm) concrete block wall, painted, with 1/2-inch (13 mm) drywall on independent steel stud walls, each side, insulation in cavities

== STC prediction ==
There are several commercially available software which predict the STC ratings of partitions using a combination of theoretical models and empirically derived lab data. These programs can predict STC ratings within several points of a tested partition and are an approximation at best.

== Outdoor-Indoor Transmission Class (OITC) ==
The Outdoor–Indoor Transmission Class (OITC) is a standard for indicating the rate of sound transmission from outdoor noise sources into a building, based on ASTM E-1332 Standard Classification for Rating Outdoor-Indoor Sound Attenuation. Unlike the STC, which is based on a noise spectrum targeting speech sounds, OITC uses a source noise spectrum that considers frequencies down to 80 Hz (aircraft/rail/truck traffic) and is weighted more to lower frequencies. The OITC value is typically used to rate, evaluate, and select exterior glazing assemblies. Examples include double- and triple-pane windows and laminated glass units, which reduce sound transmission from outdoor sources. Additional measures, such as window inserts and sealing gaps, can further enhance sound isolation performance.

== See also ==
- Acoustics
- Architectural acoustics
- Construction
- Impact insulation class
- Noise
- Noise control
- Noise reduction
- Sound Reduction Index
- Soundproofing

== Bibliography ==
- Harris, Cyril M. (1994). Noise Control in Buildings: A Practical Guide for Architects and Engineers. McGraw-Hill. ISBN 978-0-07-026887-6. OCLC 869588871.
- Ballou, Glenn M. (2008). Handbook for Sound Engineers (4 ed.). Elsevier. ISBN 978-0-240-80969-4.
