= Impact insulation class =

Impact insulation class (also known as Impact Isolation Class, or IIC) is an integer-number rating of how well a building floor attenuates impact sounds, such as footsteps. A larger number means more attenuation. The scale, like the decibel scale for sound, is logarithmic. The IIC is derived from ASTM method E989, which in turn uses a tapping machine specified in ASTM method E492.

The IIC number is derived from sound attenuation values tested at sixteen standard frequencies from 100 to 3150 Hz. "Real-world" footstep noise is also generated at frequencies below 100 Hz, so the IIC value may not accurately describe the complete noise attenuation profile of a floor.

== Field Measurements ==
Laboratory IIC ratings are measured in specialised test facilities under ASTM E492, which suppresses flanking transmission so that only the floor–ceiling assembly is rated. The corresponding rating for a completed building is the Field Impact Insulation Class (FIIC), determined from in situ impact-sound measurements in accordance with ASTM E1007. Because field measurements capture flanking transmission and other on-site conditions that are absent in the laboratory, the FIIC of an installed assembly is typically several points lower than its laboratory IIC.
