= Sound reduction index =

Sound insulation measure

The sound reduction index is used to measure the level of sound insulation provided by a structure such as a wall, window, door, or ventilator. It is defined in the series of international standards ISO 16283 (parts 1-3) and the older ISO 140 (parts 1-14), or the regional or national variants on these standards. In the United States, the sound transmission class rating is generally used instead. The basic method for both the actual measurements and the mathematical calculations behind both standards is similar, however they diverge to a significant degree in the detail, and in the numerical results produced.

Standardized methods exist for measuring the sound insulation produced by various structures in both laboratory and field (actual functional buildings and building sites) environments. A number of indexes are defined which each offer various benefits for different situations.

== Weighted Difference level (D_{w}) ==
The most basic index is the Weighted Difference level D_{w}. This index is defined by measuring in decibels (dB), the noise level produced on each side of a building element under test (e.g. a wall) when noise is produced in a room on one side (or outdoors) and measured both in the room where the noise is produced and in the room on the other side of the element under test.

This measurement may be carried out by measuring the levels in octave bands, or in 1/3 octave bands. (the latter is normally used for most applications). The minimum requirements of the standards require for the frequency range from 100 Hz to 3.15 kHz to be measured (16 1/3 octave bands). In some situations measurements may be carried out in the bands down to 50 Hz and/or up to 10 kHz.

The measured levels in each 1/3 octave band (or octave band) from the source room (or area) (S) are then compared to the measured levels in the receiving room (R), and the difference is taken (S-R). this produces a measured difference level 'D' for each frequency band in the measured spectrum.

To produce a single integer number the measured spectrum is plotted on a graph, and compared against a reference curve (defined in ISO 717-1 for airborne sound insulation, and 717-2 for impact sound insulation). The reference curve is moved in 1 dB steps until the total of the unfavorable deviations (measured points on the graph below the reference graph) is as close to 32 as possible but not greater than 32.

The value of the reference curve at 500 Hz is taken as the Weighted Difference Level, D_{w} This is considered to be approximately equal to the A-weighted level difference which would be observed if normal speech was used as the test signal.

== Sound Reduction Index (R) ==
The Sound Reduction Index is expressed in decibels (dB). It is the weighted sound reduction index for a partition or single component only. This is a laboratory-only measurement, which uses knowledge of the relative sizes of the rooms in the test suite, and the reverberation time in the receiving room, and the known level of noise which can pass between the rooms in the suite by other routes (flanking) plus the size of the test sample to produce a very accurate and repeatable measurement of the performance of the sampled material or construction.

=== Single-number rating ===
The frequency-dependent sound reduction index R is measured in one-third-octave (or octave) bands. To obtain the single-number weighted sound reduction index R_{w}, the measured band values are compared with a standard reference curve, which is shifted in 1 dB steps towards the measured curve until the sum of the unfavourable deviations is as large as possible but not greater than 32.0 dB (using the sixteen one-third-octave bands from 100 to 3150 Hz). R_{w} is then the value of the shifted reference curve at 500 Hz. This rating procedure is specified in ISO 717-1.

== Apparent Sound Reduction Index (R') ==
This is a field measurement which attempts to measure the sound reduction index of a material on a real completed construction (e.g. a wall between two offices, houses or cinema auditoriums). It is unable to isolate or allow for the result of alternate sound transmission routes and therefore will generally produce a lower result than the laboratory measured value.

The calculation method used to produce the Sound Reduction Index takes into account the relative size of the tested rooms, and the size of the tested panel, and is therefore (theoretically) independent of these features, therefore a 1×1 panel of plasterboard (drywall) should have the same R_{w} as a 10×10 panel.

== Normalized Level Difference (D_{n}) ==
This is an index which is measured in field conditions, between "real" rooms. It is a measurement which deliberately includes effects due to flanking routes and differences in the relative size of the rooms. It attempts, however, to normalize the measured difference level to the level which would be present when the rooms are furnished by measuring the quantity of acoustic absorption in the receiving room and correcting the difference level to the level which would be expected if there was 10m^{2} Sabine absorption in the receiving room. Detailed, accurate knowledge of the dimensions of the receiving room are required.

== Standardized Level Difference (D_{nT}) ==
Similar to the normalized level difference, this index corrects the measured difference to a standardized reverberation time. For dwellings, the standard reverberation time used is 0.5 seconds, for other larger spaces longer reverberation times will be used. 0.5 seconds is often cited as approximately average for a medium-sized, carpeted and furnished living room. Due to not requiring detailed and accurate knowledge of the dimensions of the test rooms, this index is easier to obtain, and arguably of slightly more relevance.

Once the difference level or sound reduction index is obtained, the weighted value may be obtained from the corrected spectrum as described above from the reference curve.

== How does the Weighted Sound Reduction Index (R_{w}) relate to a Weighted Level Difference (D_{w})? ==
The calculation to convert from R_{w} to D_{w} has to account for:

- The area size of the separating partition, a bigger wall means more area of sound energy to transmit through. A bigger surface area means a higher R_{w} is required to achieve the same D_{w.}
- The volume of the ‘receiving’ room. The smaller the space, the greater the concentration of sound energy, the higher the sound pressure level. A smaller volume means a higher R_{w} is required to achieve the same D_{w.}
- The reverberation time of the ‘receiving’ room, which is the time taken for sound to decay by 60 dB. A high reverberation time means a build up in noise levels from sound reflecting around the room, with energy being dissipated slowly from a lack of absorbent materials. A higher reverberation time means a higher R_{w} is required to achieve the same D_{w.}
- Possible flanking transmission on-site due to a potential downfall in construction quality or inattention in design to junction and penetrating detailing. The higher the risk of flanking, the more compensating in the R_{w} rating to achieve the same D_{w.}
