= Artex (disambiguation) =

Artex is a surface coating used for interior decorating.

Artex may also refer to:

- Artex Ltd., English manufacturer of building materials
- Artex Art Fair, New Zealand (1986–1994)
- Artex S.A., Cuban company which produces and distributes artistic works
- Artex (song), single by the British musical collective A Band, 1993
- Artex Compound, a permanently flooded village in Malabon, Philippines

== See also ==
- Artexte
