= Acoustic ceiling =

Acoustic ceiling may refer to:

- Dropped ceiling
- Popcorn ceiling
