= Artex Art Fair =

Artex (Art Expo Fair) began in 1986 in Auckland, New Zealand in 1986 and ran until 1994. It was the first art fair to be held in New Zealand which showcased historical and contemporary New Zealand art. Artex was the genesis for what is now known as the Auckland Art Fair.

== History ==
The first Artex, titled ARTEX 86 was held from 27 – 31 August 1986 at the Princes Wharf Passenger Terminal Building in Auckland New Zealand. The first Artex event was opened by the Minister of Arts, The Right Honourable Sir Peter Tapsell. In 1989 the fair was opened by the right honourable Margaret Austin and former chair-person of The Arts Council (now Creative New Zealand) Mr Hamish Keith. The first fair included 33 dealer galleries, groups and individual artists including the Auckland Society of the Arts. The event also featured demonstrations and videos of prominent New Zealand artists such as Philip Clairmont, loaned by the Auckland Art Gallery. The organizer Warwick Henderson, a businessman, art collector and investment art dealer was concerned that New Zealand contemporary artists failed to receive the recognition they deserved because artists and their dealers simply failed to actively promote and sell their work. This lack of promotion of contemporary New Zealand art to a New Zealand audience was the motivation behind New Zealand’s first Art Fair. Henderson stated at the time, "there is a perception art is for the elite only and many potential buyers feel intimidated visiting dealer galleries. I am hoping to break down these barriers and make art accessible for all."

Arts writer John Daly-Peoples stated ‘there is an underlying belief that good art will sell itself and that the number of people who pass through the gallery is not really relevant.' ‘While tens of thousands might attend a well promoted exhibition some smaller dealer galleries count attendance in dozens.' While 'there are no exhibitions of New Zealand art attracting people in their tens of thousands.' The blockbuster exhibitions in New Zealand were public institution arranged exhibitions such as Monet, Henry Moore and ‘Te Maori’ (a travelling exhibition of traditional Maori carvings and artifacts that eventually travelled internationally). New Zealand contemporary art shows had never gained this level of attention.

Despite this the Artex art fair’s inaugural event in 1986 attracted unprecedented crowds, with a ‘steady stream of visitors’ and attendance records for the first show reaching 12,000 The show itself sold around $300,000 worth of art work. There was also significant media attention surrounding Artex, with a report on the fair on television NZ headline 6pm News. The New Zealand Herald also featured ARTEX in an article on 1 September headed ‘Over 12,000 visit Art Fair.’ There were several radio interviews including a comprehensive interview with the organizer on Radio New Zealand's National Program. The first fair was also subject to some controversy when with Leighton Smith, host of New Zealand's leading radio show, Newstalk ZB complained on air that he had to spend $10 for entry. The organizer also criticised the Arts Council of New Zealand for failing to support the show by way of funding or a grant.

== New Zealand Art Market ==
Artex marked a change in New Zealand’s art market, with a more direct concentration on the ‘business of art,’ as it not only put a focus on New Zealand Artists - celebrating modern New Zealand work as well as its historical art heritage, it revealed contemporary New Zealand paintings by leading New Zealand artists such as Colin McCahon, Toss Woollaston, Michael Smither, John Weeks, Allen Maddox, Keith Patterson, Philip Clairmont, Frances Hodgkins, Ian Scott, Dick Frizzell and Dean Buchanan. For the many thousands of visitors it was their first live exposure to serious New Zealand contemporary art. ARTEX paved the way for contemporary art in New Zealand to become more mainstream and accessible to the general public and budding art collectors. Owing to the success of the first ARTEX in 1986, further shows were held in Auckland, Wellington and Christchurch. Artex (Art Fairs) TM, currently owned by DMG Group.
