= Blue Hawk =

Blue Hawk may refer to:

- Blue Hawk Mine, Blue Grouse Mountain, British Columbia, Canada
- Blue Hawk (roller coaster), at Six Flags Over Georgia, Georgia, U.S.
- Blue Hawk (video game)
- Blue Hawk, brand of Artex Ltd.

== See also ==
- Blue hawker, a species of hawker dragonfly
