= Ceiling =

Overhead interior surface

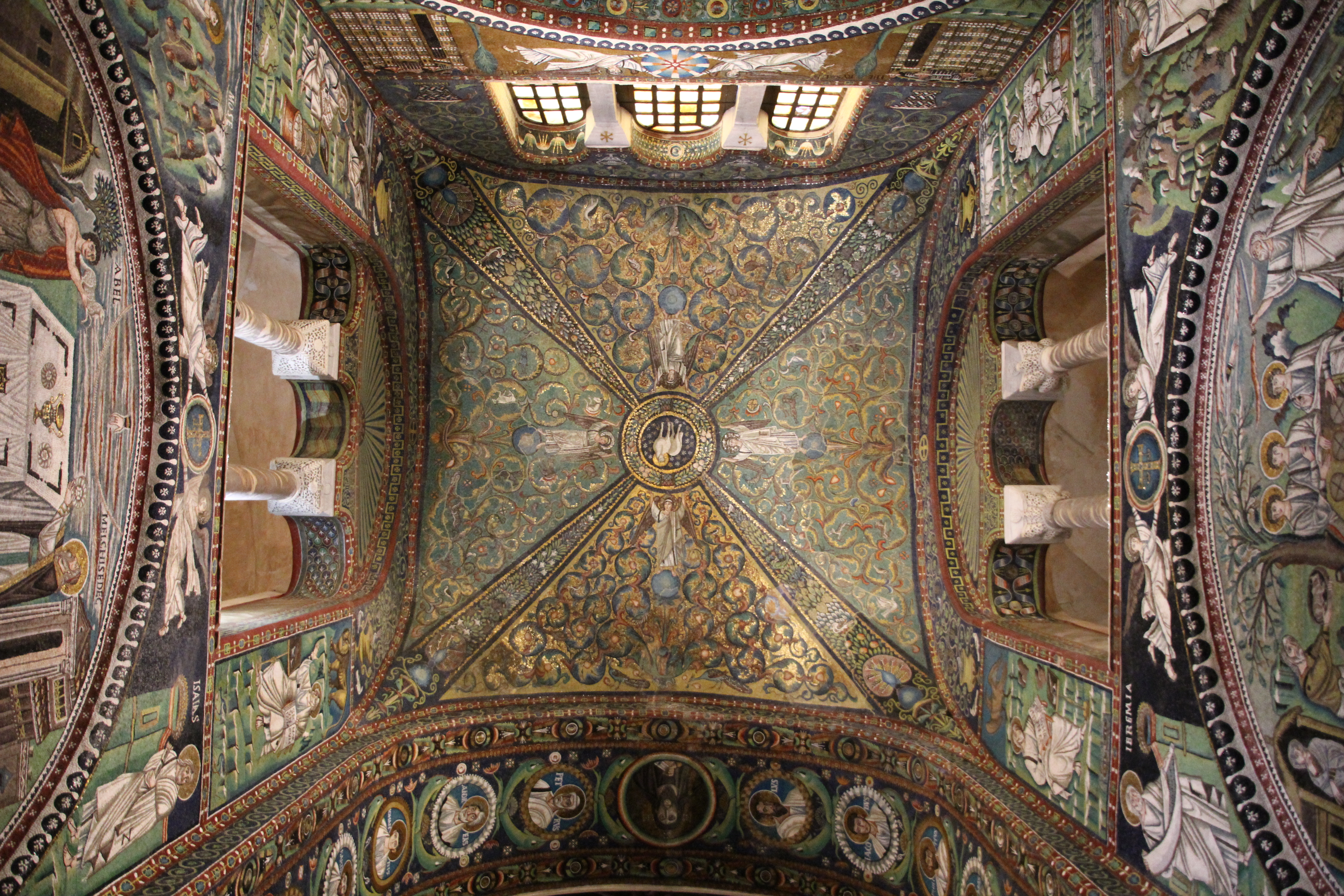
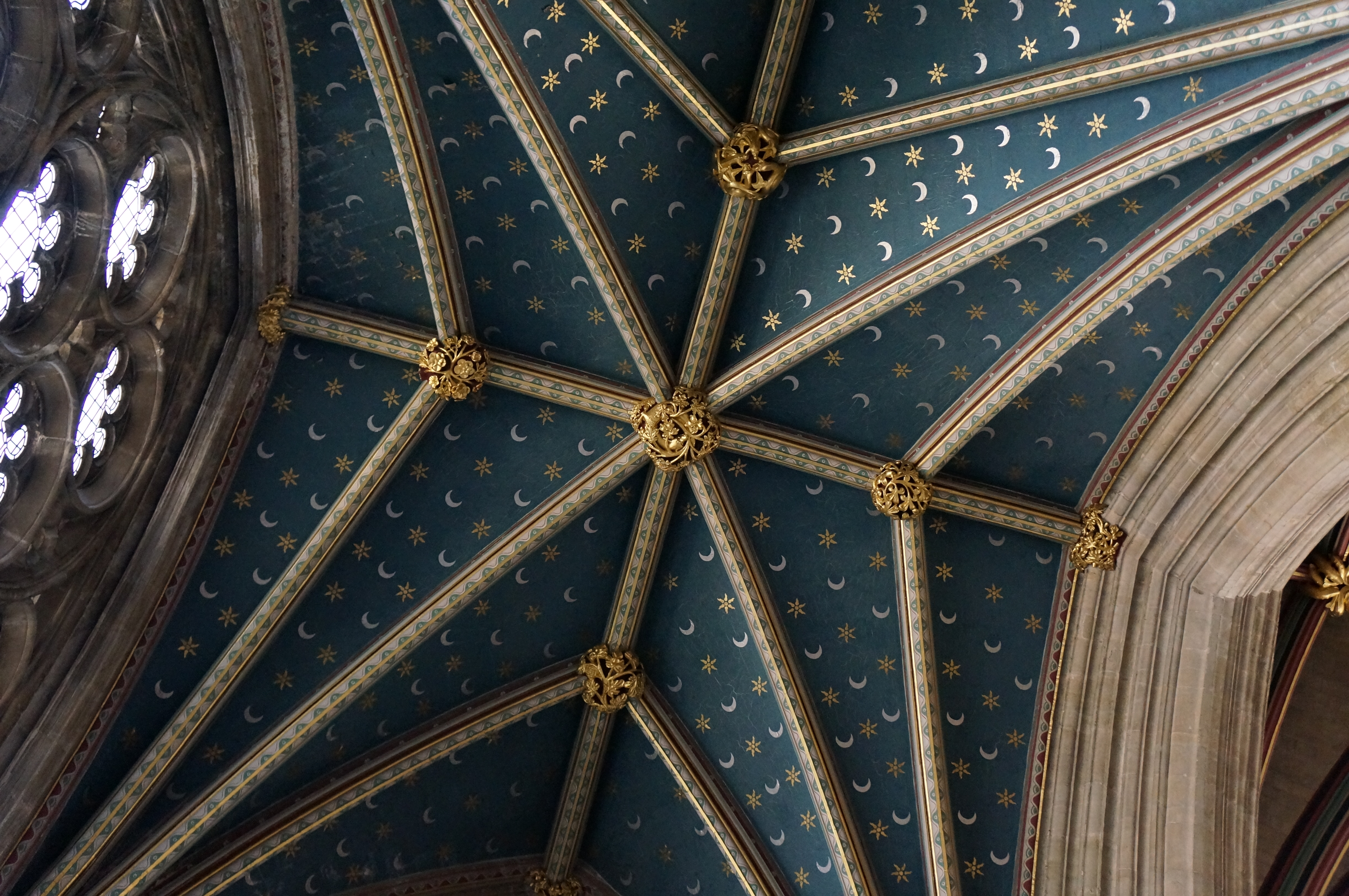
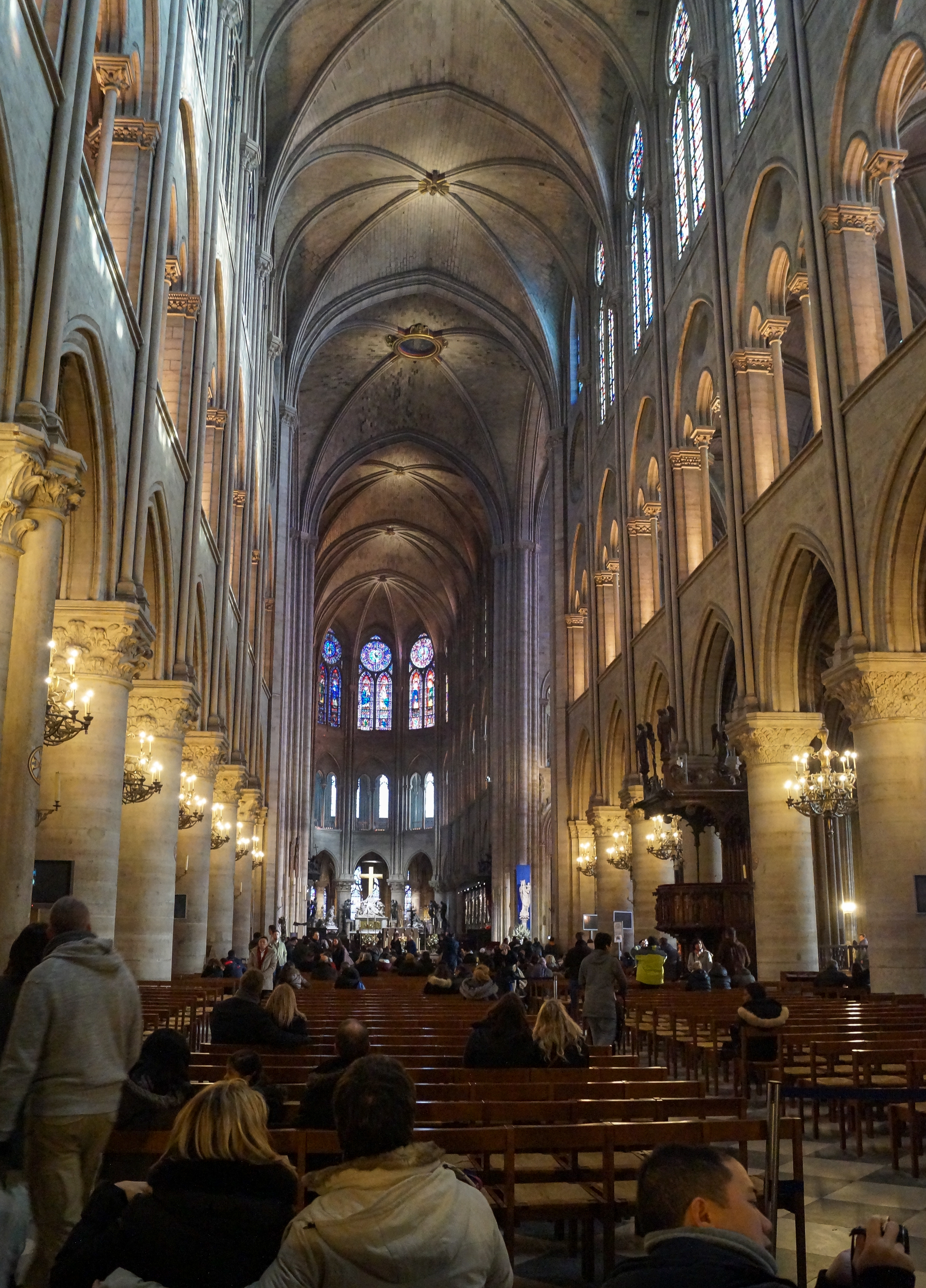
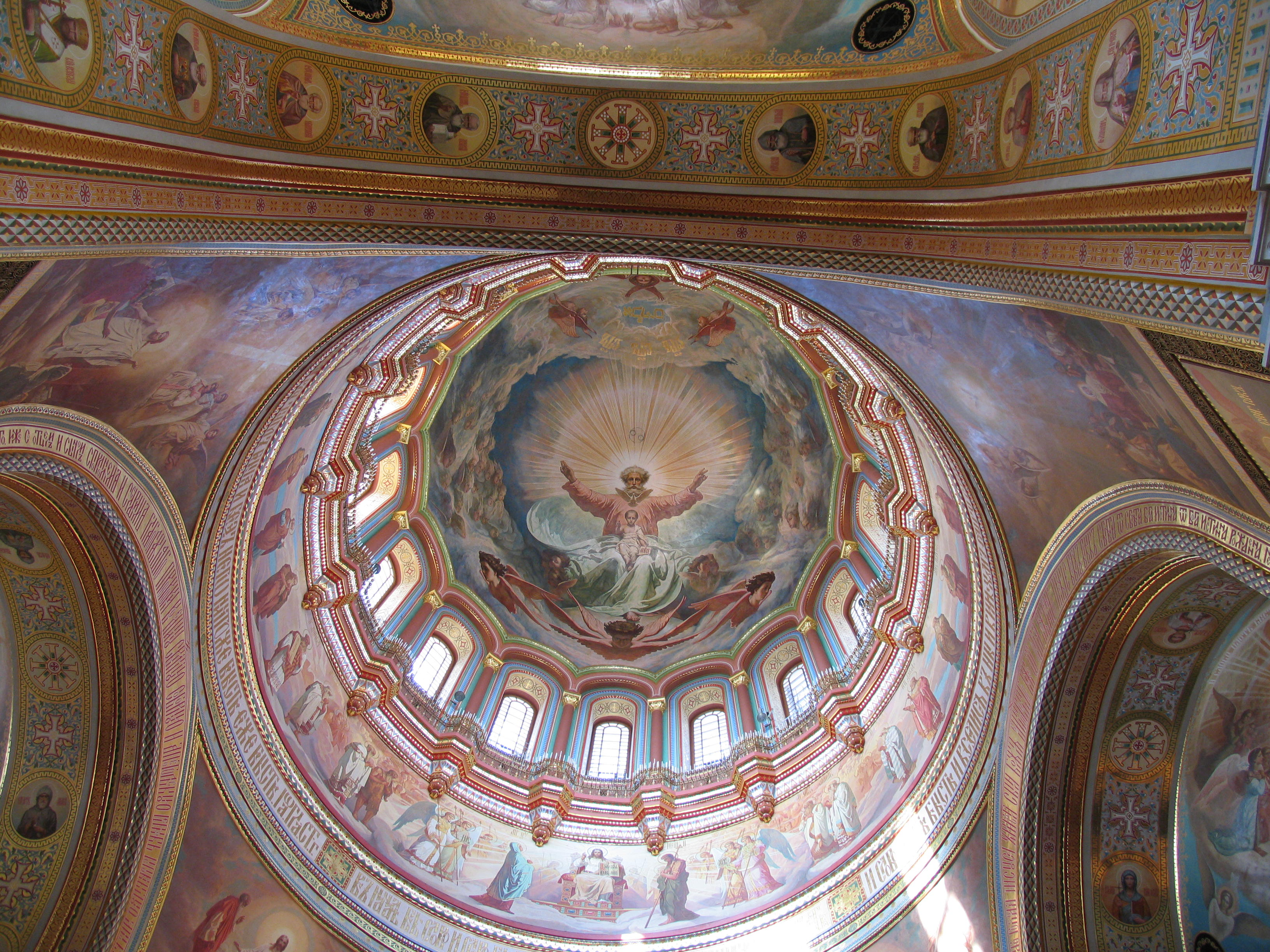
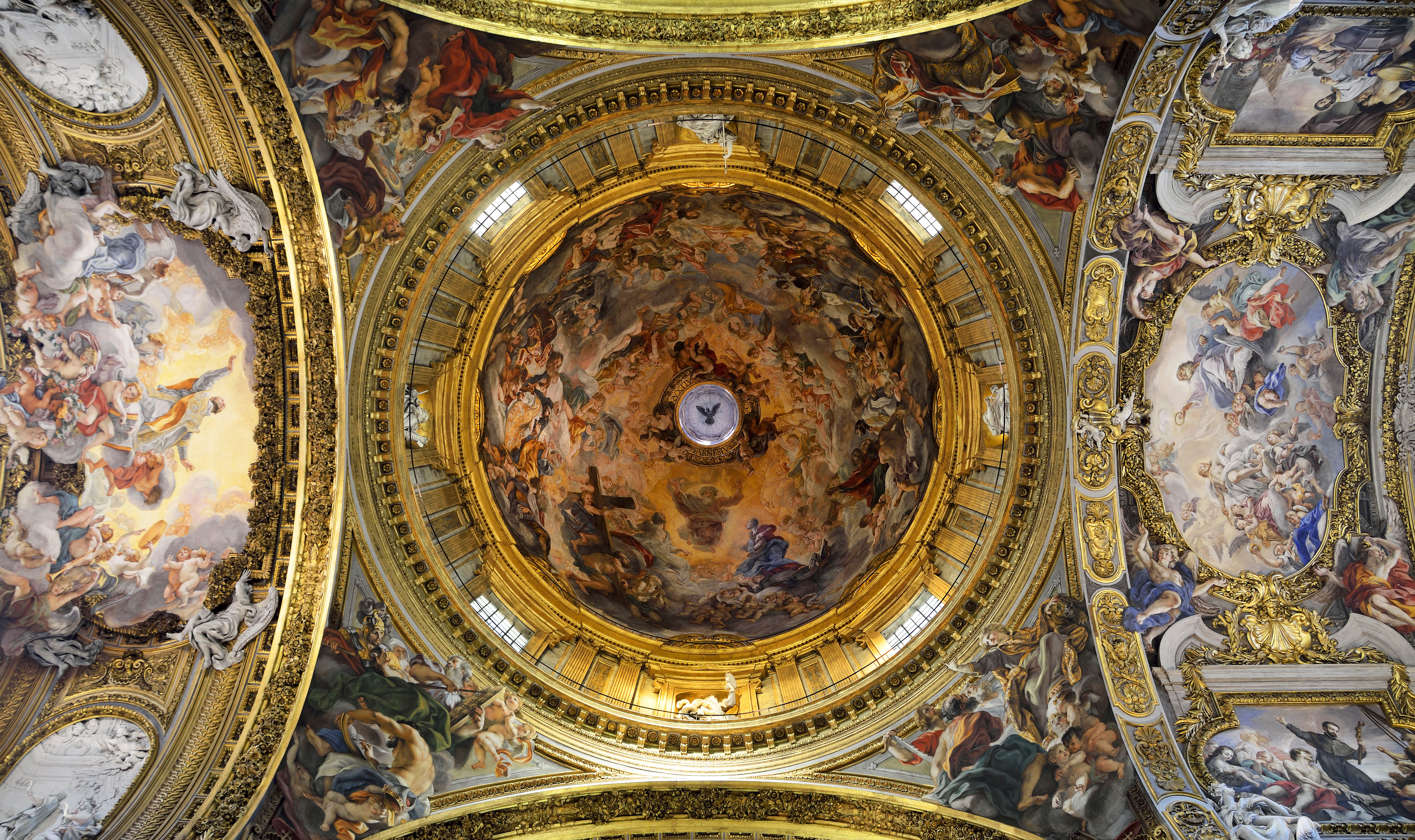
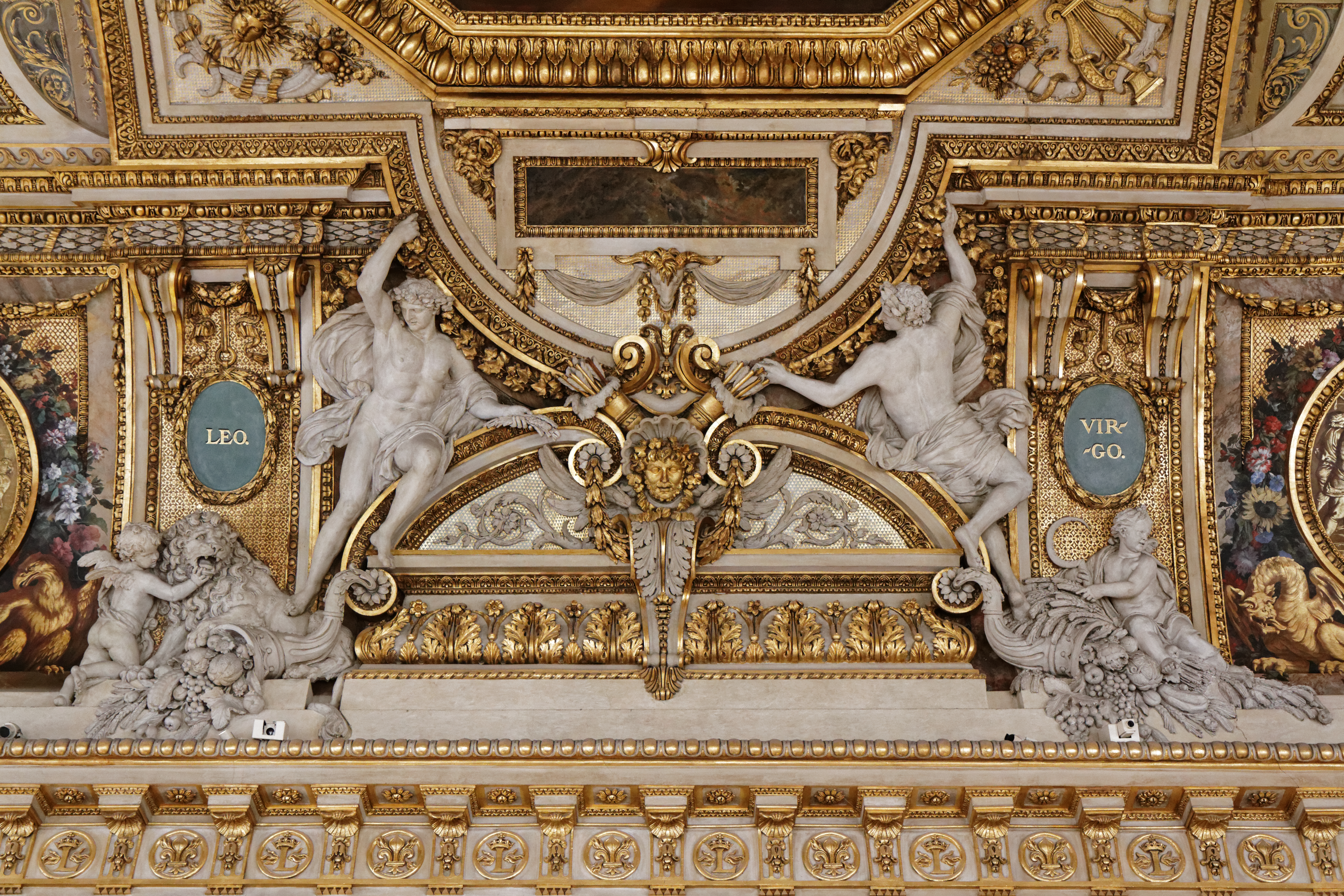
Various examples of ornate ceilings

A ceiling is an overhead interior roof that covers the upper limits of a room. It is not generally considered a structural element, but a finished surface concealing the underside of the roof structure or the floor of a story above. Ceilings can be decorated to taste, and there are many examples of frescoes and artwork on ceilings, especially within religious buildings. A ceiling can also be the upper limit of a tunnel.

The most common type of ceiling is the dropped ceiling, which is suspended from structural elements above. Panels of drywall are fastened either directly to the ceiling joists or to a few layers of moisture-proof plywood which are then attached to the joists. Pipework or ducts can be run in the gap above the ceiling, and insulation and fireproofing material can be placed here. Alternatively, ceilings may be spray painted instead, leaving the pipework and ducts exposed but painted, and using spray foam.

A subset of the dropped ceiling is the suspended ceiling, wherein a network of aluminum struts, as opposed to drywall, are attached to the joists, forming a series of rectangular spaces. Individual pieces of cardboard are then placed inside the bottom of those spaces so that the outer side of the cardboard, interspersed with aluminum rails, is seen as the ceiling from below. This makes it relatively easy to repair the pipes and insulation behind the ceiling, since all that is necessary is to lift off the cardboard, rather than digging through the drywall and then replacing it.

Other types of ceiling include the cathedral ceiling, the concave or barrel-shaped ceiling, the stretched ceiling and the coffered ceiling. Coving often links the ceiling to the surrounding walls. Ceilings can play a part in reducing fire hazard, and a system is available for rating the fire resistance of dropped ceilings.

== Types ==
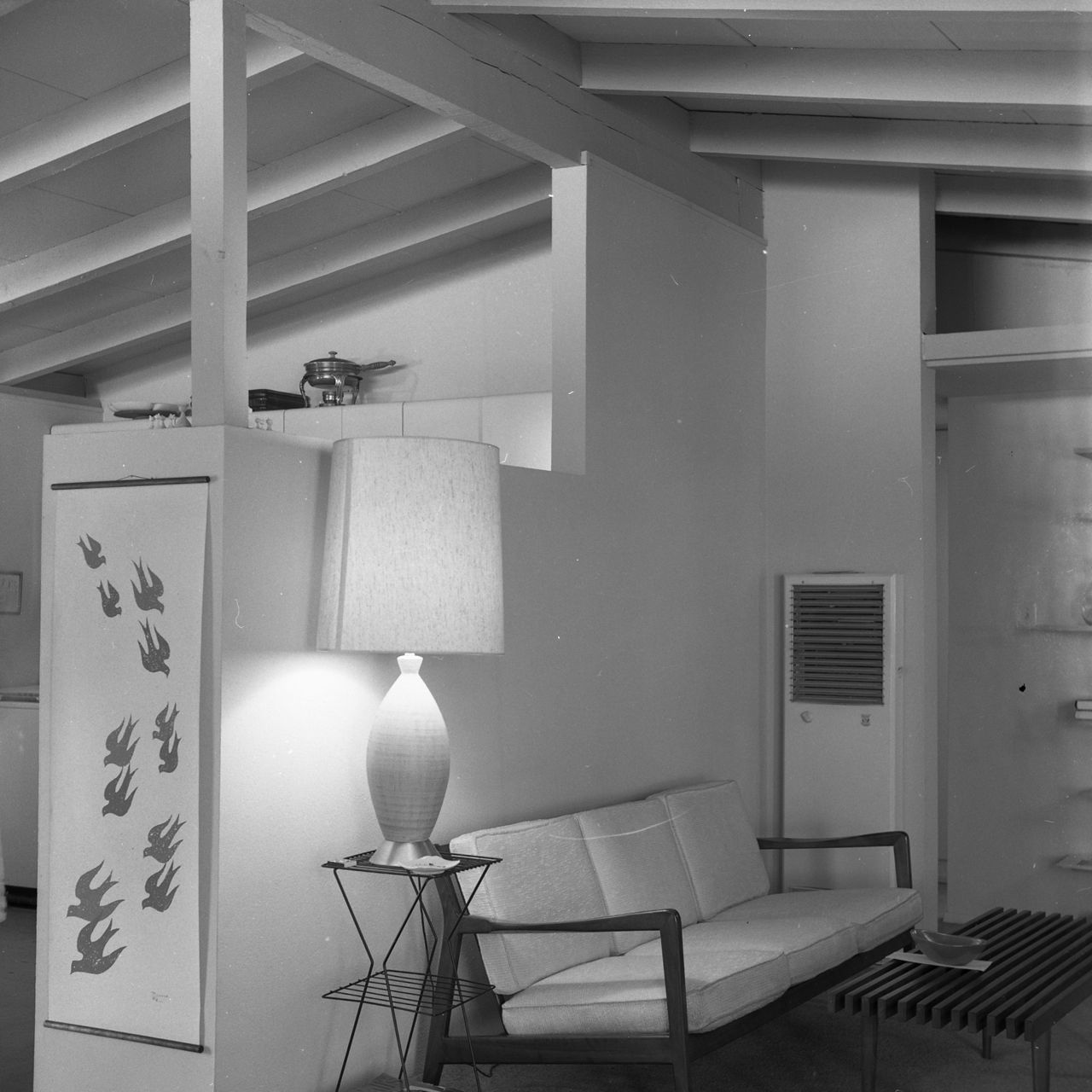
California tract home with an open-beam ceiling, 1960

Ceilings are classified according to their appearance or construction. A cathedral ceiling is any tall ceiling area similar to those in a church. A dropped ceiling is one in which the finished surface is constructed anywhere from a few inches or centimeters to several feet or a few meters below the structure above it. This may be done for aesthetic purposes, such as achieving a desirable ceiling height; or practical purposes such as acoustic damping or providing a space for HVAC or piping. An inverse of this would be a raised floor. A concave or barrel-shaped ceiling is curved or rounded upward, usually for visual or acoustical value, while a coffered ceiling is divided into a grid of recessed square or octagonal panels, also called a "lacunar ceiling". A cove ceiling uses a curved plaster transition between wall and ceiling; it is named for cove molding, a molding with a concave curve. A stretched ceiling (or stretch ceiling) uses a number of individual panels using material such as PVC fixed to a perimeter rail.

== Elements ==
Ceilings have frequently been decorated with fresco painting, mosaic tiles and other surface treatments. While hard to execute (at least in place) a decorated ceiling has the advantage that it is largely protected from damage by fingers and dust. In the past, however, this was more than compensated for by the damage from smoke from candles or a fireplace. Many historic buildings have celebrated ceilings. Perhaps the most famous is the Sistine Chapel ceiling by Michelangelo.

Ceiling height, particularly in the case of low ceilings, may have psychological impacts.

== Fire-resistance rated ceilings ==
The most common ceiling that contributes to fire-resistance ratings in commercial and residential construction is the dropped ceiling. In the case of a dropped ceiling, the rating is achieved by the entire system, which is both the structure above, from which the ceilings is suspended, which could be a concrete floor or a timber floor, as well as the suspension mechanism and, finally the lowest membrane or dropped ceiling. Between the structure that the dropped ceiling is suspended from and the dropped membrane, such as a T-bar ceiling or a layer of drywall, there is often some room for mechanical and electrical piping, wiring and ducting to run.

An independent ceiling, however, can be constructed such that it has a stand-alone fire-resistance rating. Such systems must be tested without the benefit of being suspended from a slab above in order to prove that the resulting system is capable of holding itself up. This type of ceiling would be installed to protect items above from fire.

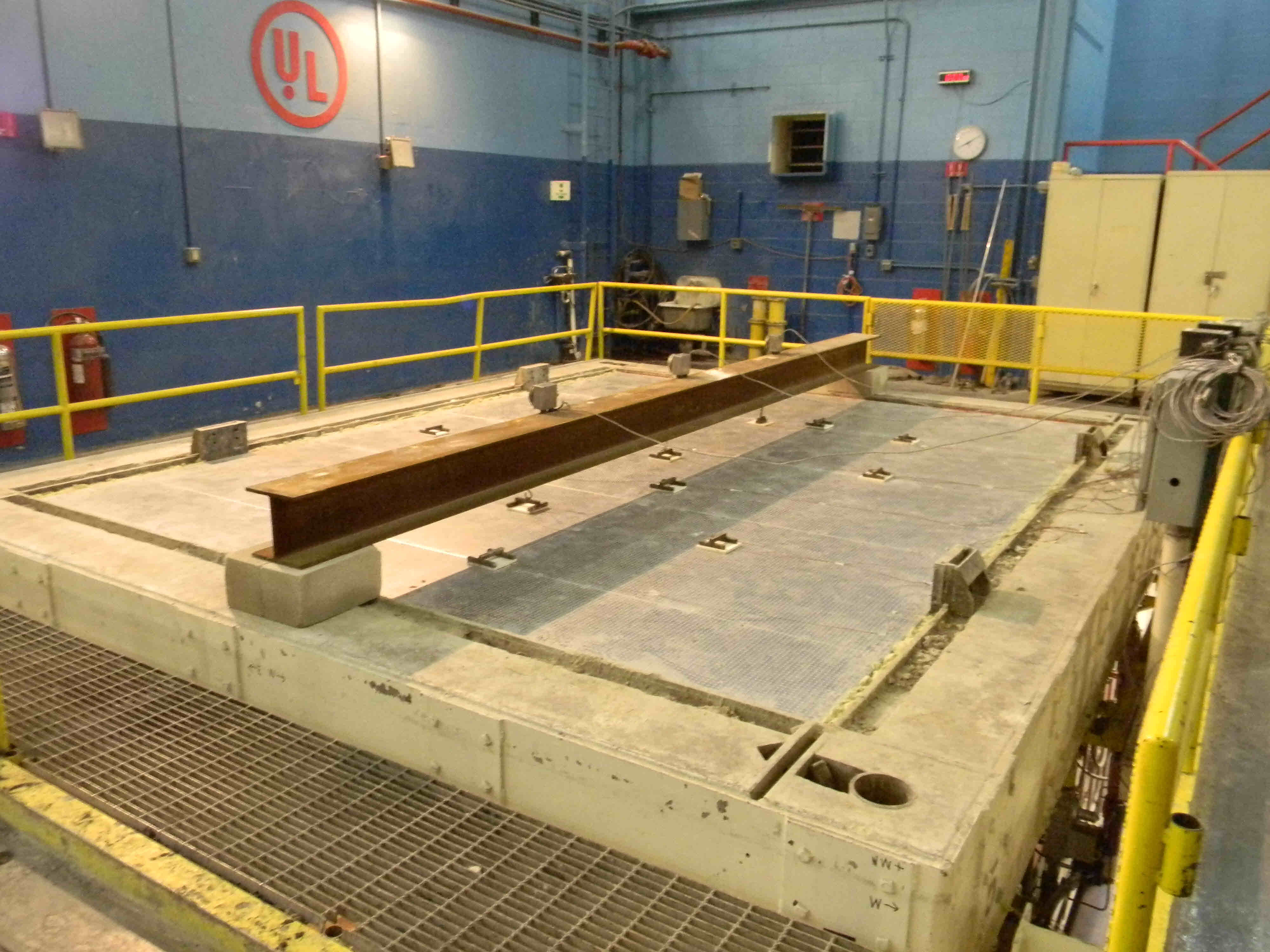
An unrestrained non-loadbearing ceiling undergoing a 4-hour fire test. Deflection is measured off the I-beam.

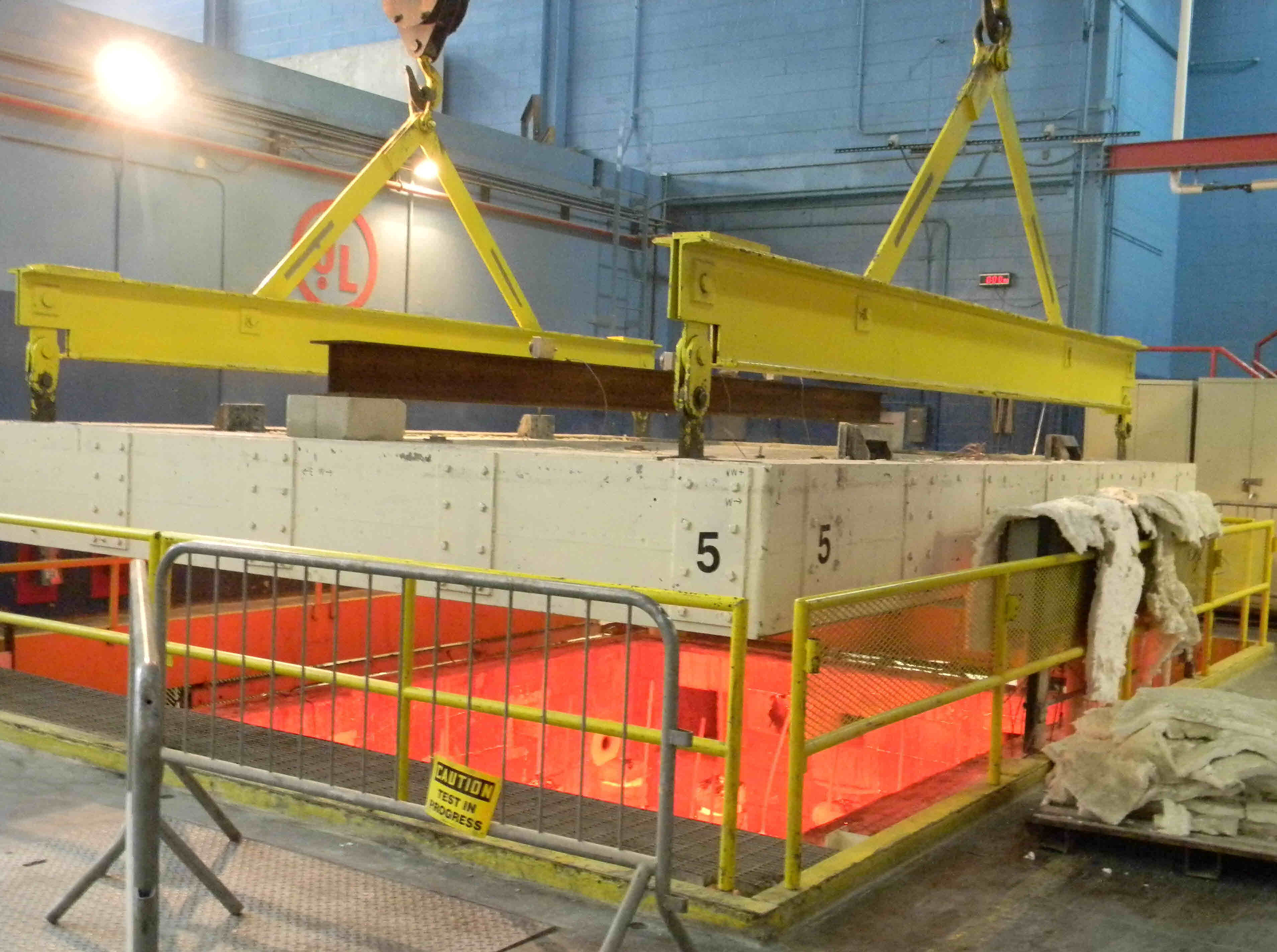
Durasteel ceiling after successful fire test, being raised from the furnace and readied for an optional 45PSI (3.1 bar) hose-stream test.

== Gallery ==
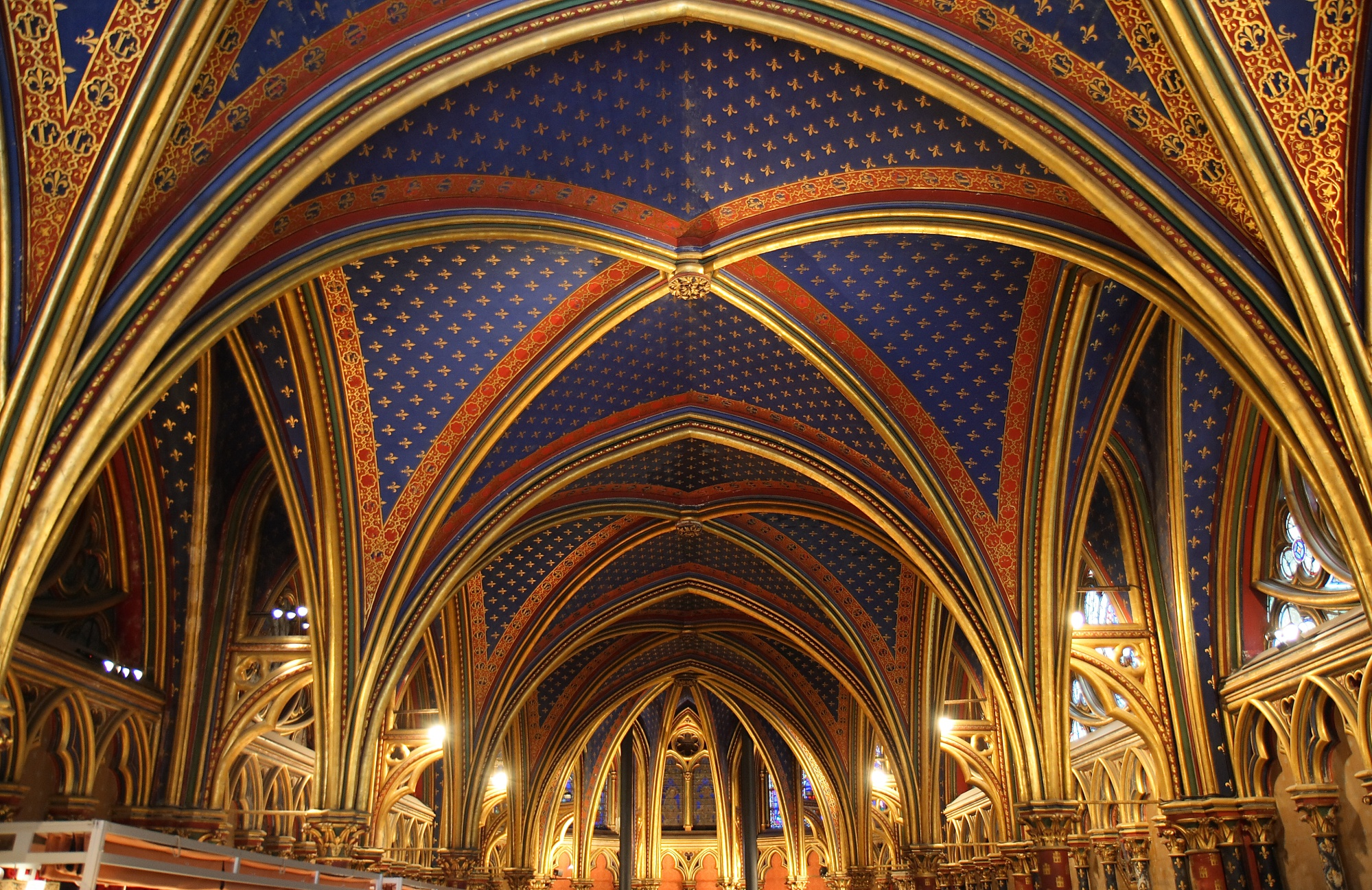
Gothic ceiling in the Sainte-Chapelle, Paris, 1243-1248, by Pierre de Montreuil

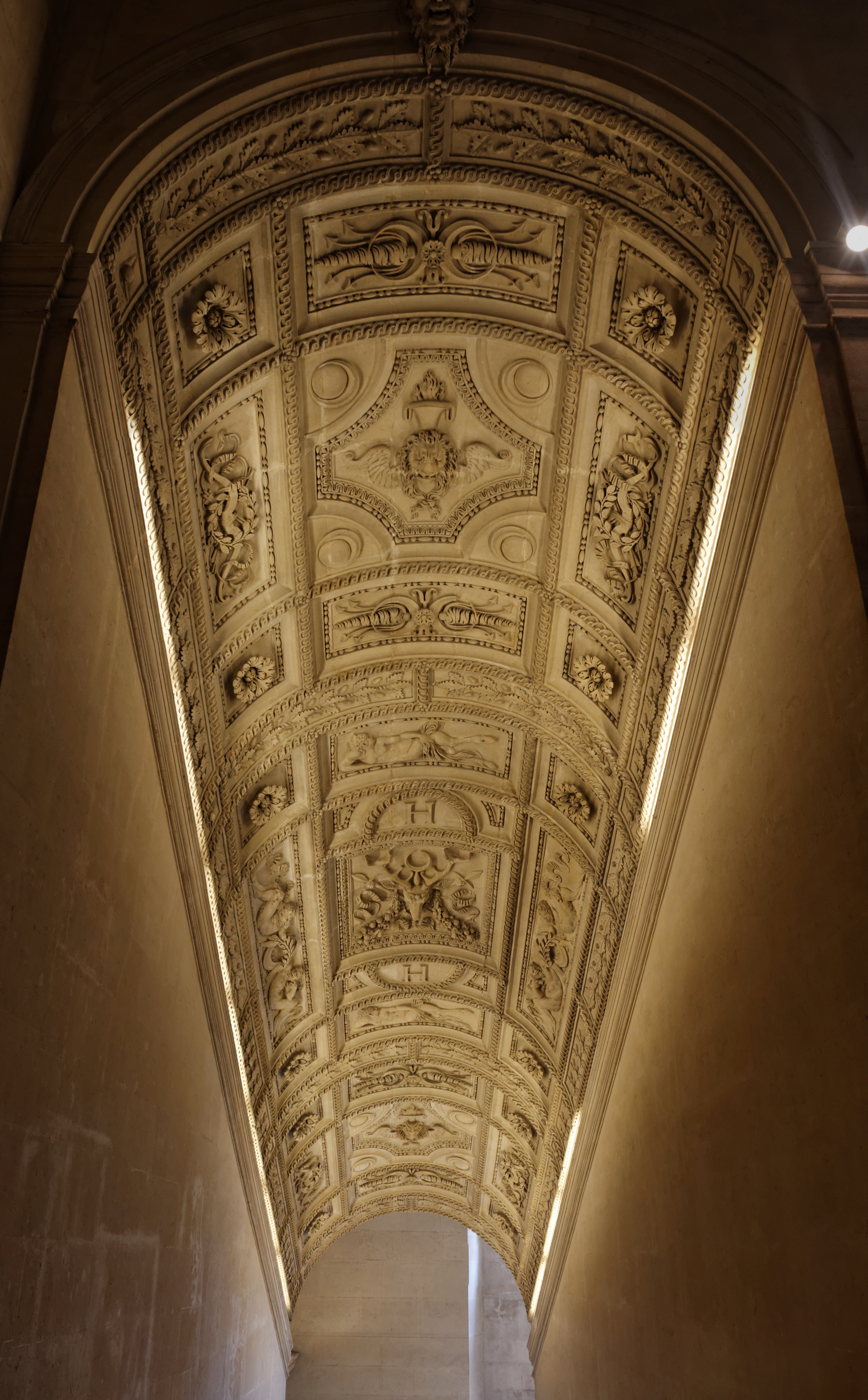
Renaissance ceiling of the Henry II staircase in the Louvre Palace, Paris, by Étienne Carmoy, Raymond Bidollet, Jean Chrestien and François Lheureux, 1553

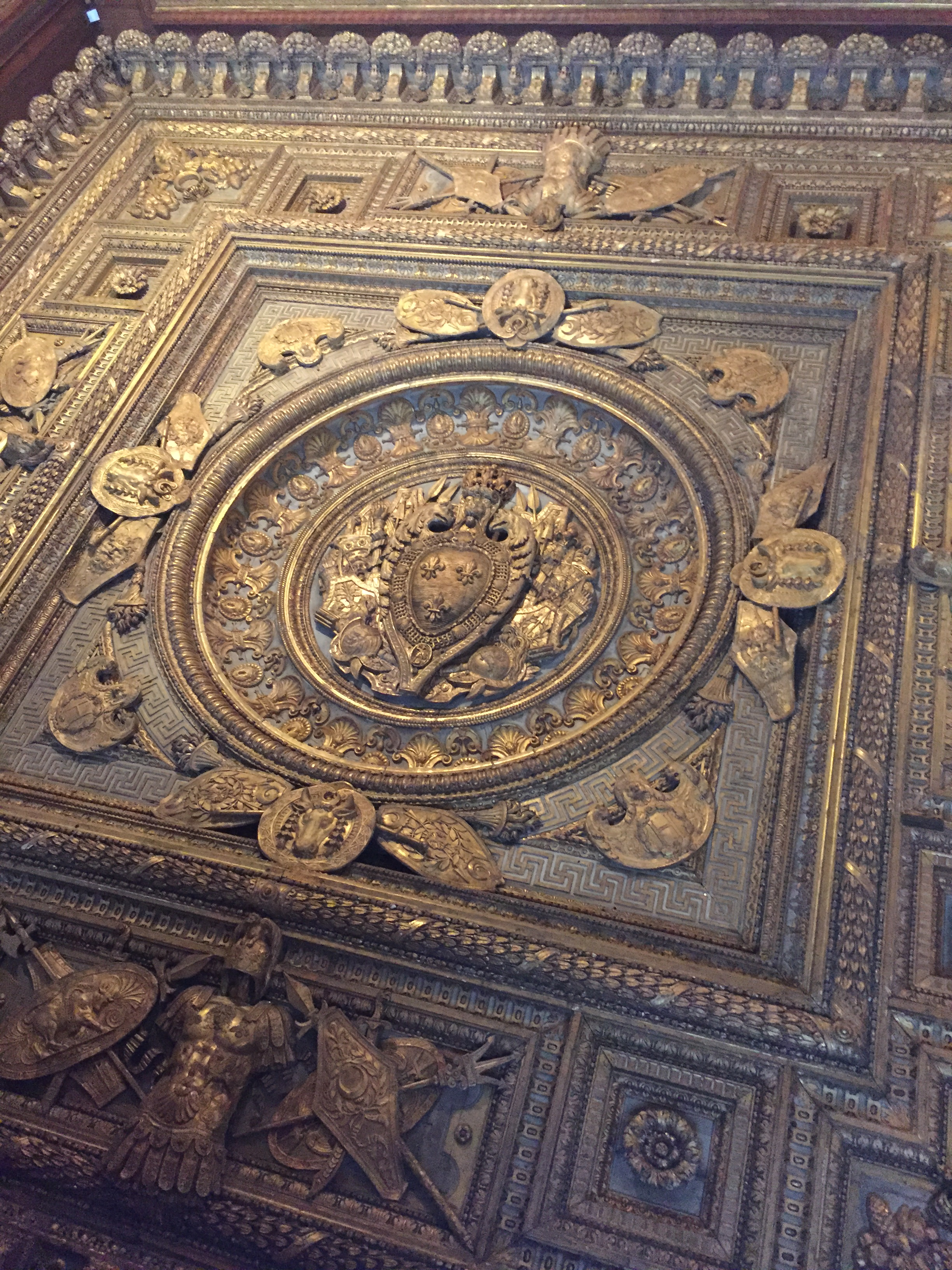
Renaissance ceiling of the king's bedroom in the Louvre Palace, by Francisque Scibecq de Carpi, 1556

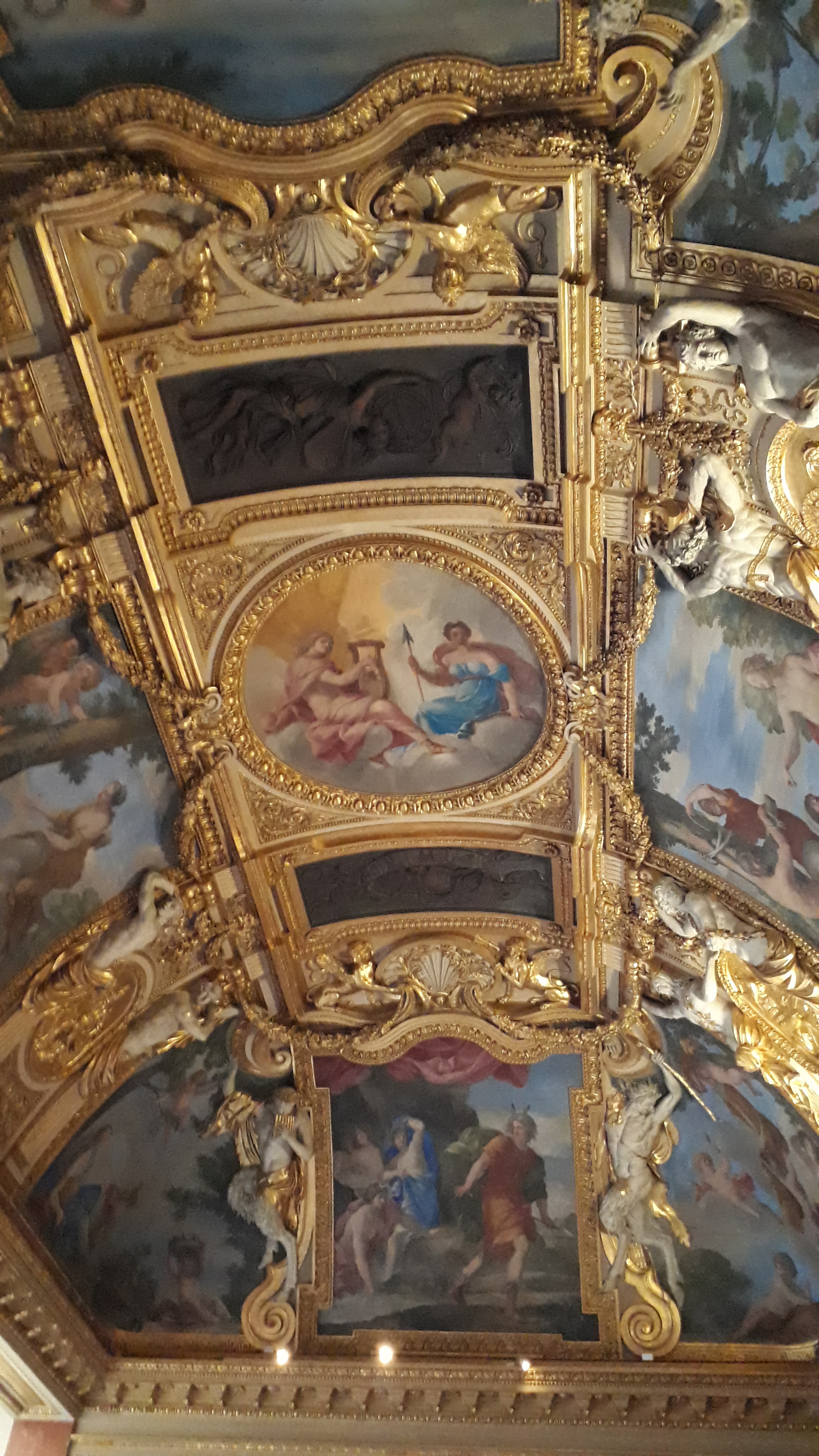
Baroque ceiling of the Salle des Saisons in the Louvre Palace, by Giovanni Francesco Romanelli, Michel Anguier and Pietro Sasso, mid 17th century

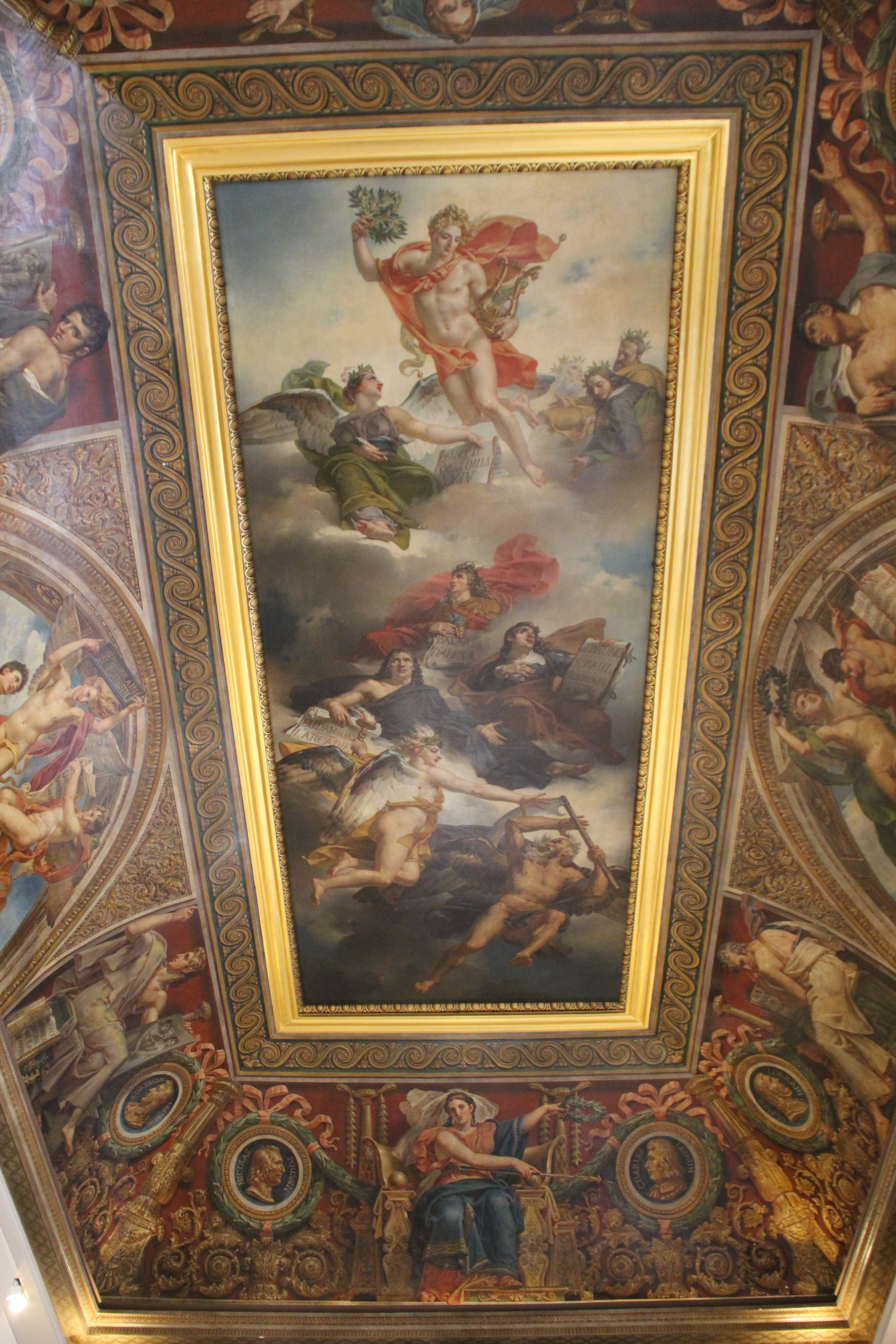
Neoclassical ceiling of the Salle Duchâtel in the Louvre Palace, with The Triumph of French Painting. Apotheosis of Poussin, Le Sueur and Le Brun in the centre, by Charles Meynier, 1822, and ceilings panels with medallion portraits of French painters, 1828-1833

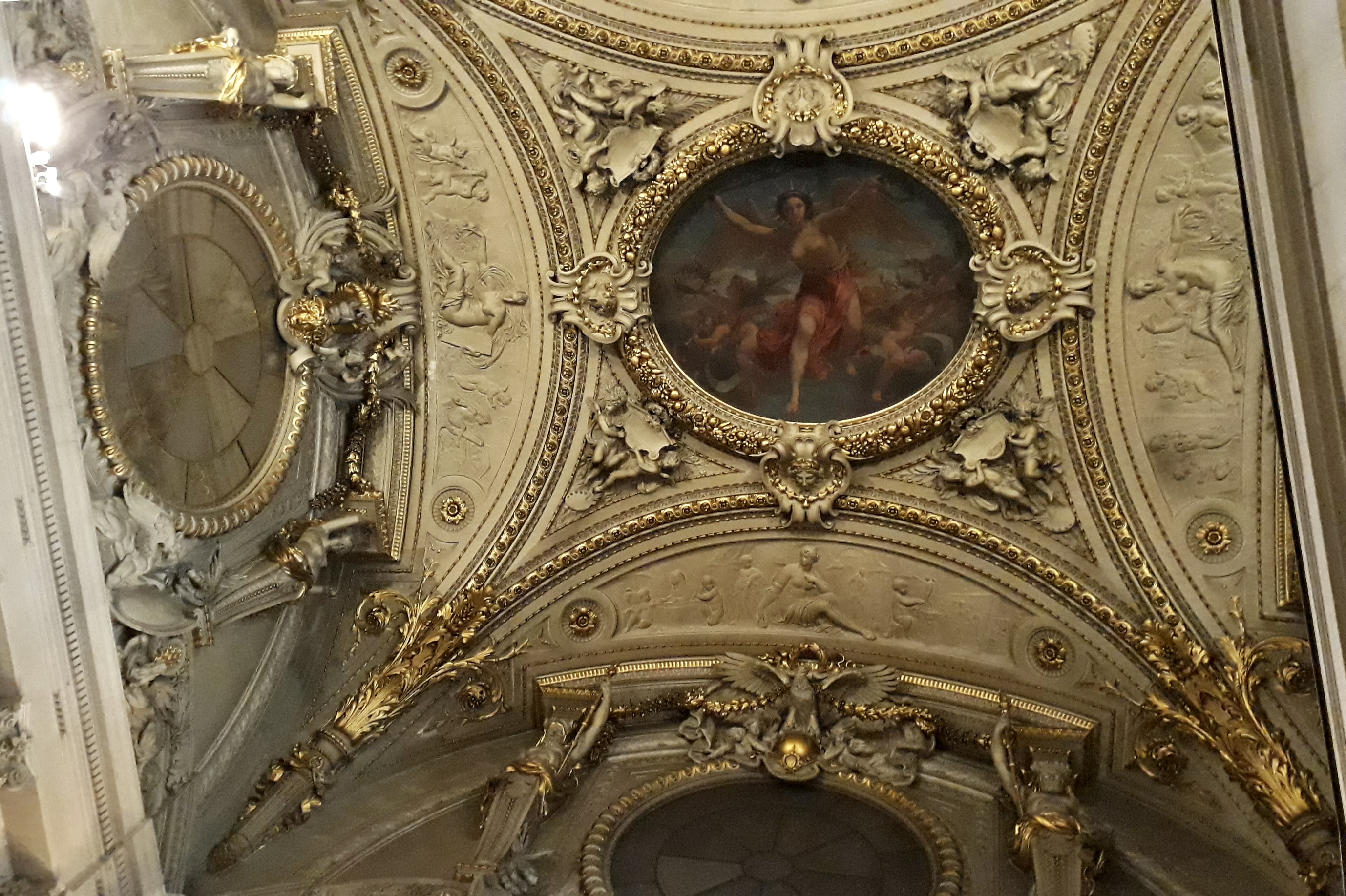
Neoclassical ceiling of the Mollien staircase in the Louvre Palace, designed by Hector Lefuel in 1857 and painted by Charles Louis Müller in 1868-1870

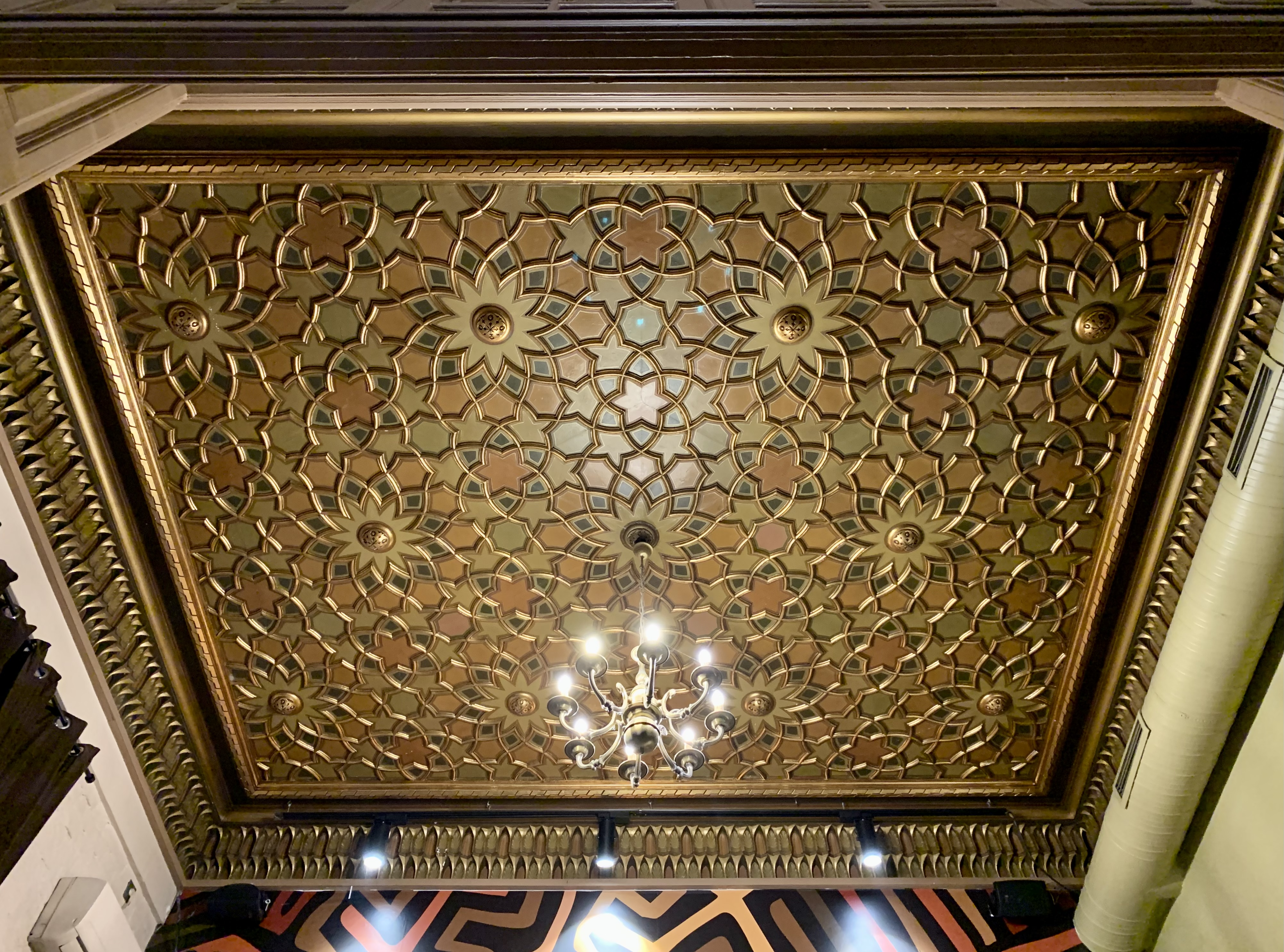
Moorish Revival ceiling in the Nicolae T. Filitti/Nae Filitis House (Calea Dorobanților no. 18), Bucharest, Romania, de Ernest Doneaud, c.1910

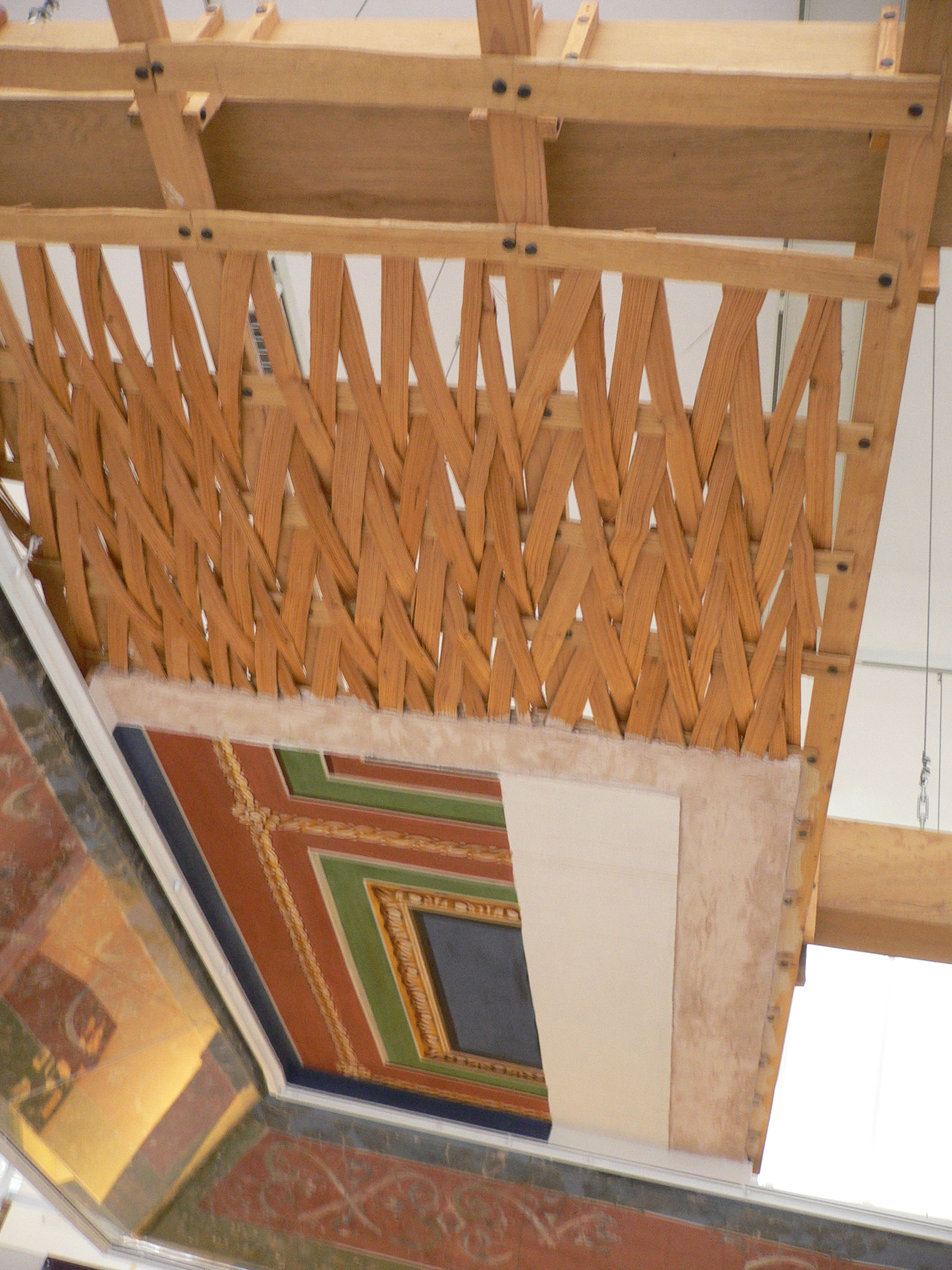
Demonstrative reconstruction of a Roman suspended ceiling in an Imperial palace of circa AD 306 at Trier, Italy

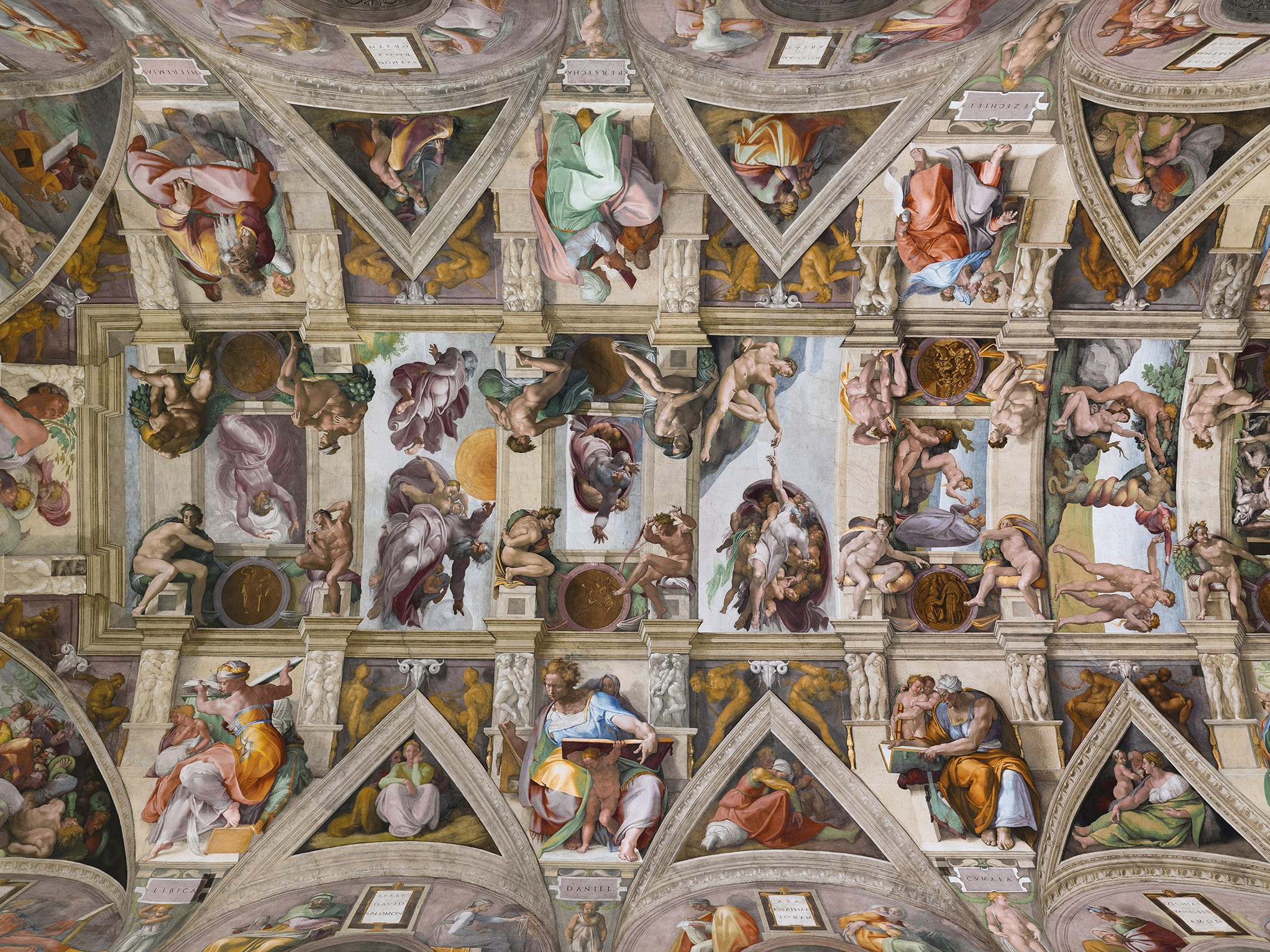
Part of the ceiling of the Sistine Chapel in Vatican City in Rome, showing the ceiling in relation to the other frescoes

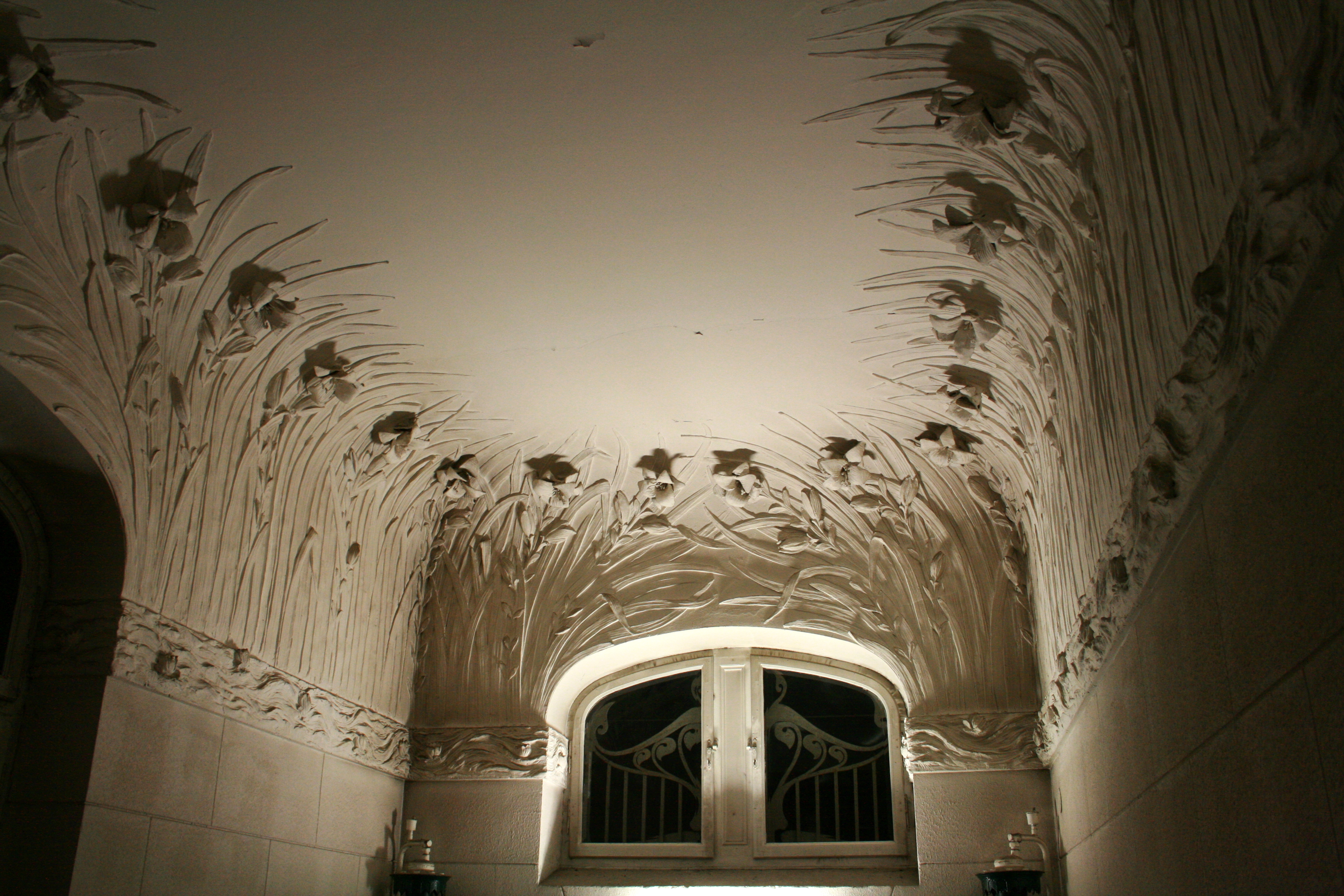
Ceiling of the Villa Schutzenberger from Strasbourg, France, decorated with Art Nouveau ornaments

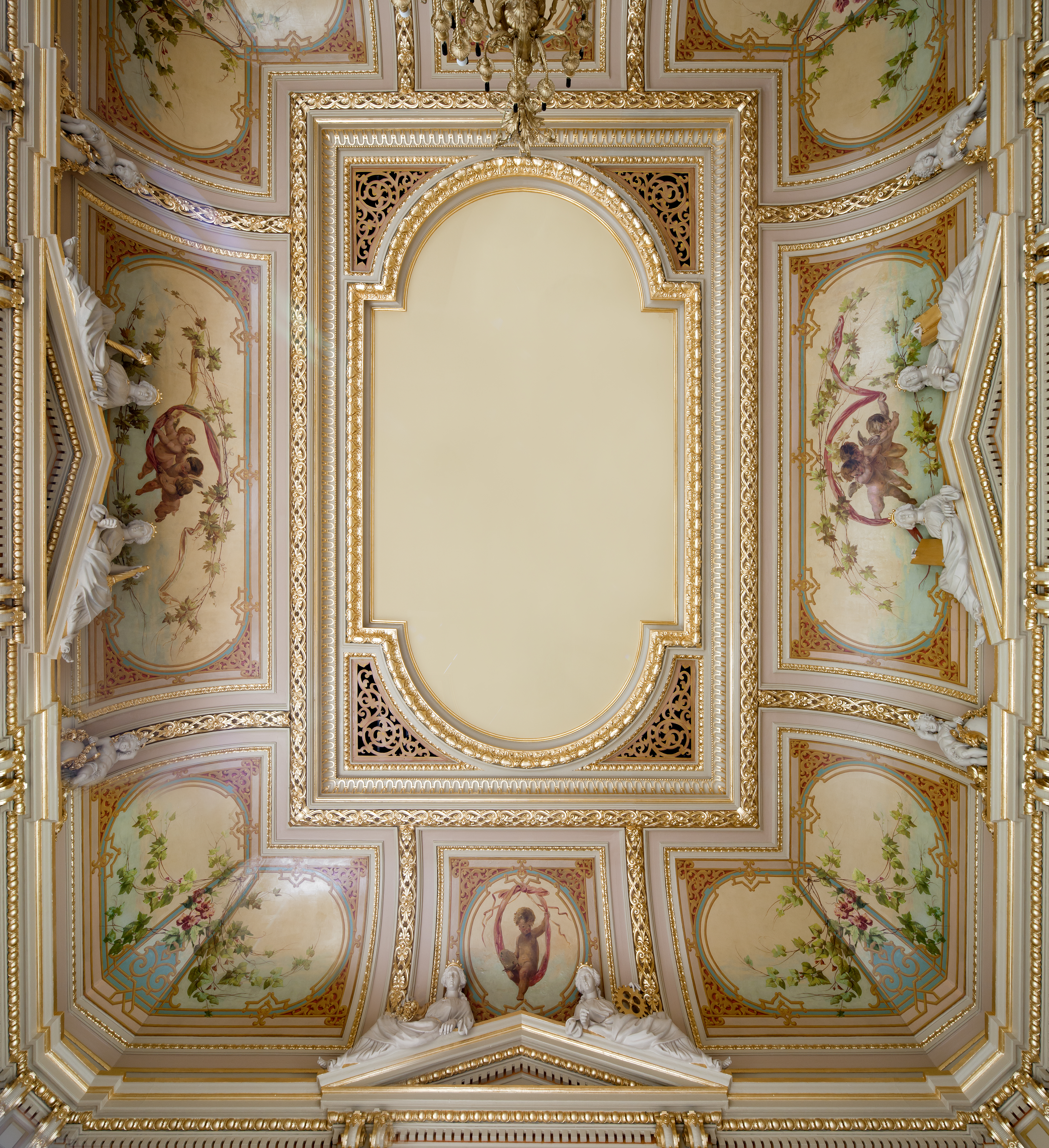
Painted ceiling in Liège, Belgium

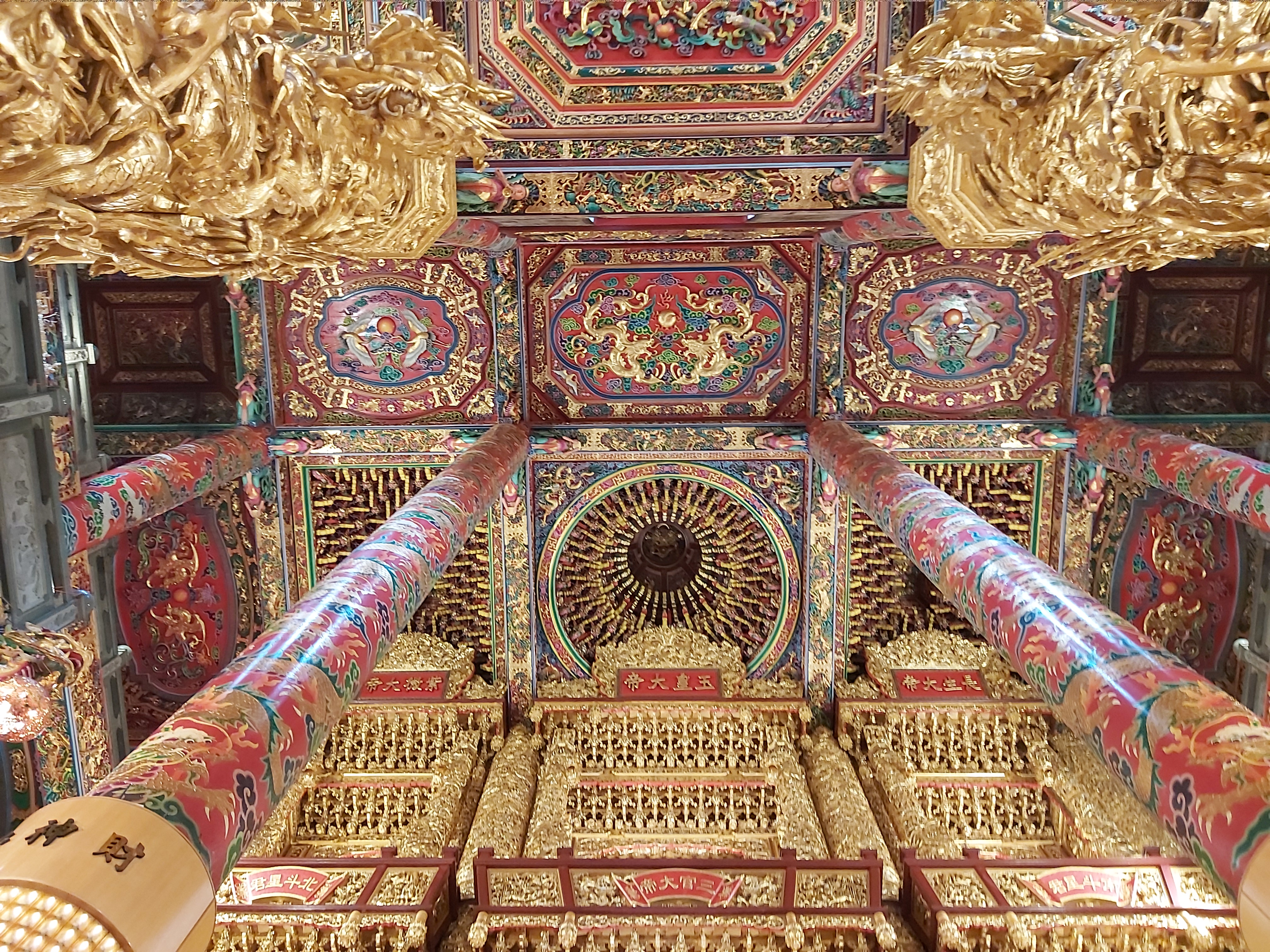
Traditional Chinese ceiling of Dayuan Renshou Temple at Taoyuan, Taiwan

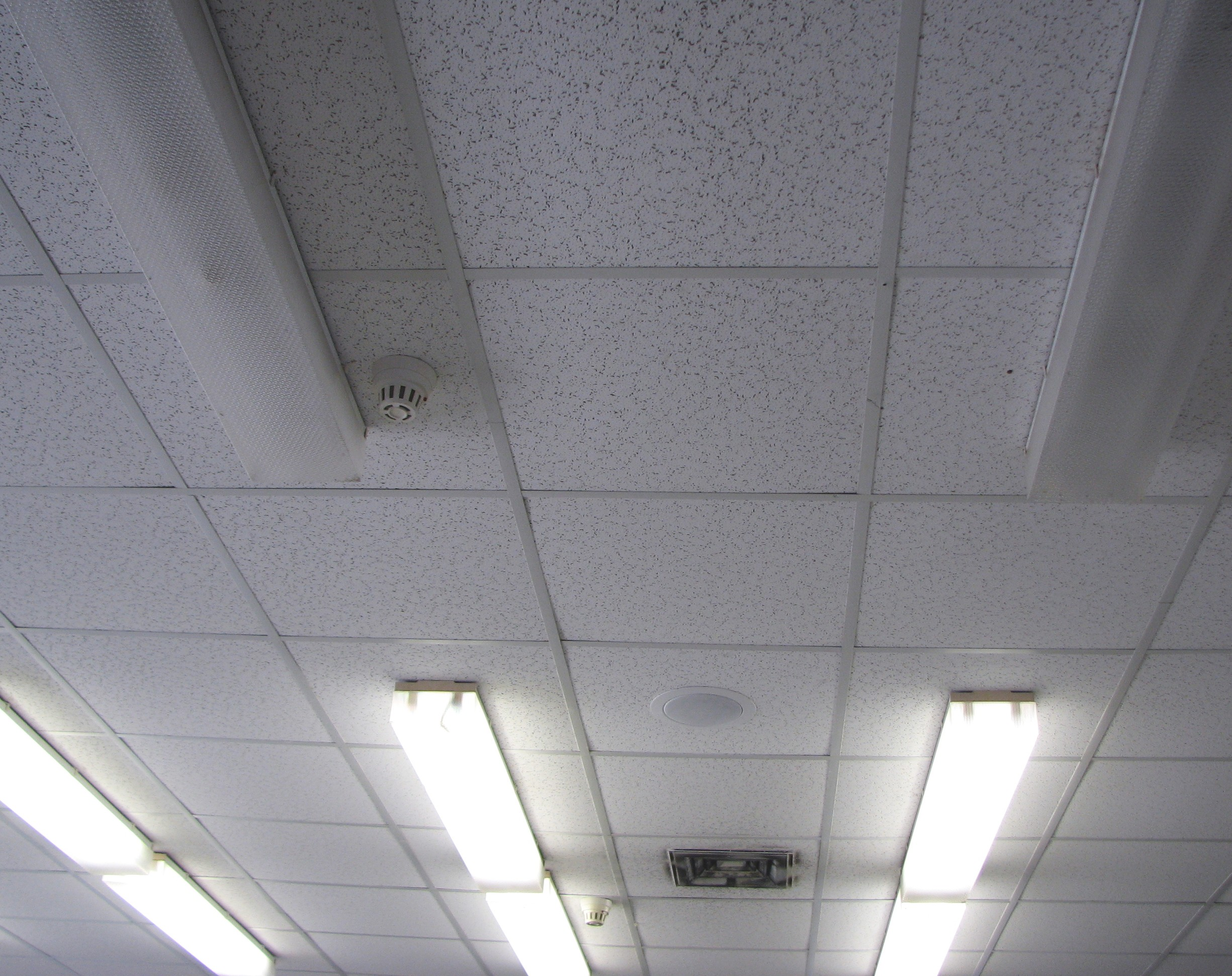
Dropped ceiling

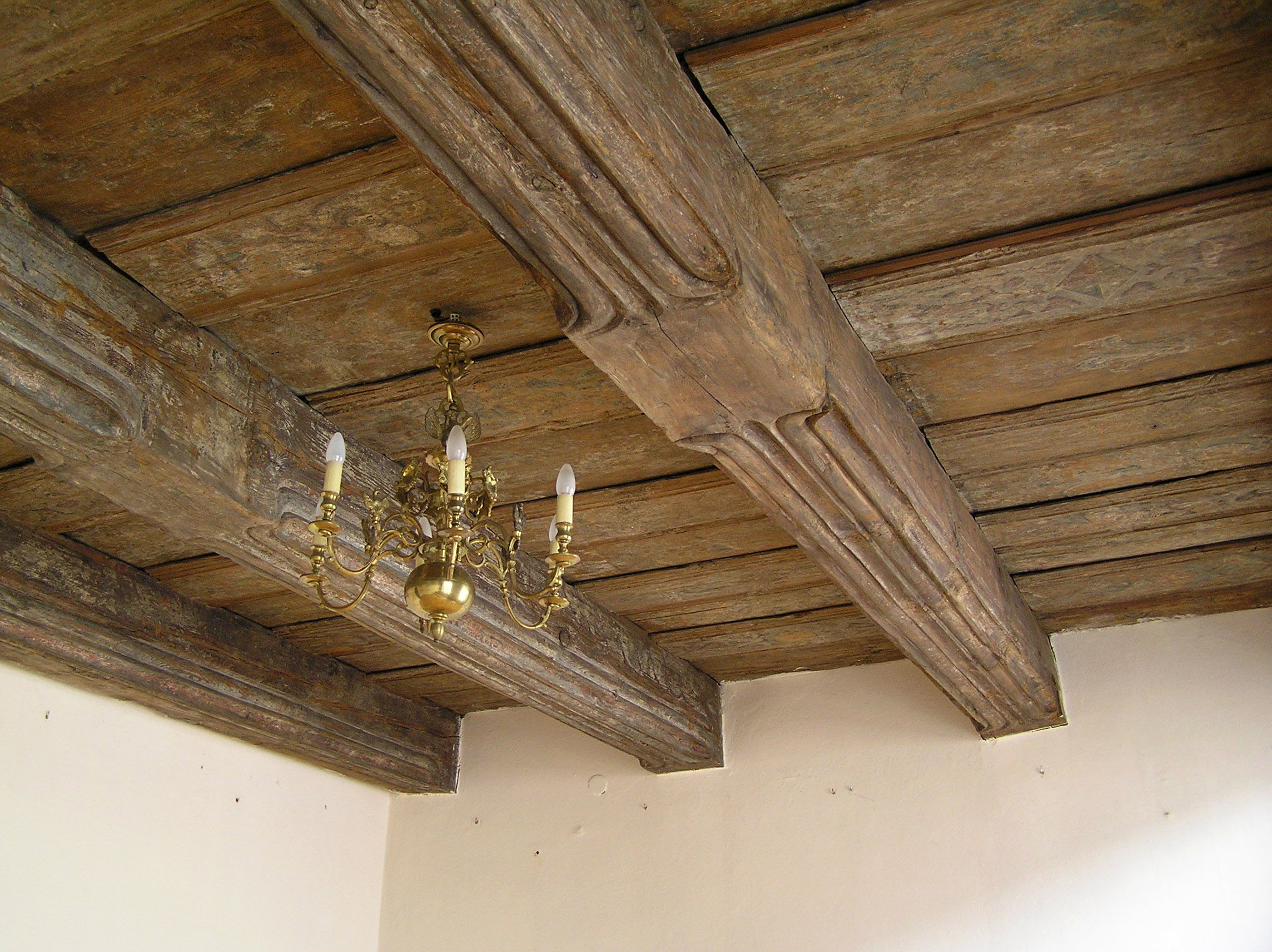
Wooden beam ceiling

== See also ==
- Beam ceiling
- Hammerbeam roof
- Hollow-core slab
- Moulding (decorative)
- Popcorn ceiling
- Scottish Renaissance painted ceilings
- Tin ceiling
- Passive fire protection
- Fire test
