= Warwick Henderson =

Warwick Henderson (born 1953 Te Kōpuru, New Zealand), is a New Zealand gallerist, art collector, art fair pioneer and author of "Behind the Canvas – An Insider's Guide to the New Zealand Art Market" and "The Fascinating History of Toys and Games around The World".

== Background ==
Henderson launched an Art Business in the late 1970s from an office in Emily Place, Auckland, New Zealand where he established an art trading and export company, initially specialising in the exports of New Zealand created artwork.

== Arts career ==
Henderson established the Artex Art Fair in New Zealand in 1986. Artex 86 was opened by the Minister of Arts Sir Peter Tapsell who attacked arts administrators for their monocultural attitudes and lack of support for a National Museum. "He congratulated the organiser Warwick Henderson for his initiative in setting up the first artfair to promote local artists". The Artex Art Fairs ran until the mid-1990's and were held in three main New Zealand centers including Auckland, Wellington and Christchurch. In 2004 Henderson was instrumental in the formation of the "Contemporary Fine Art Dealers Association (CFADA 2004 - 2006) based in Auckland, New Zealand. As vice president, together with the steering committee, Henderson co-founded the inaugural Auckland Art Fair in 2005. Henderson built a purpose built dealer gallery/apartment building in Parnell in 1987. The building designed by Houston Architects won the Auckland Architects Association Best Building Award in 1988. The Warwick Henderson Gallery has since held over 350 exhibitions and has represented New Zealand artists such as Michael Illingworth, Philip Trusttum, Nigel Brown, Mervyn Williams, Fatu Feu'u, Philippa Blair, Robyn Kahukiwa, Dame Louise Henderson, Trevor Moffitt, Keith Patterson, Grace Wright and Rozi Demant. Henderson has been involved in the promotion of South Pacific Art in New Zealand, this being a theme at several New Zealand art fairs where he has exhibited. In 2018 Henderson sold the Contemporary NZ Dealer Gallery he had established in 1987. He continues to operate as an art consultant, valuer, auctioneer, and trader of NZ and international art under his art trading company formed in 1979 (now Warwick Fine Art Ltd).

Henderson also holds an Auctioneers licence and has organised fundraiser and general art auctions since 1985.

== Museum exhibitions ==
From 1996 to 1998 Henderson curated two shows which toured museums in New Zealand, "The Toy Show" and “The Games Show”. The Museums that hosted these shows included, among others, the Auckland War Memorial Museum – Tamaki Paenga a Hira, the Waikato Museum – Te Whare Taonga O and the Christchurch Museum. The shows involved hundreds of early period and antique games and toys, revealing the way these items reflect and record the path of social and economic history. In 2020 Te Papa Tongarewa Museum of NZ acquired a significant portion of Henderson's NZ vintage games and illustrated jigsaw puzzles including a rare wooden puzzle depicting the signing of the Treaty of Waitangi. Other early games referenced NZ history such as anti-axis puzzles produced during the 2nd World War and sports such as Rugby and Show Jumping.

== Publications ==
Henderson wrote a book on the New Zealand Art Market and Art Collecting (“Behind the Canvas – An Insider's Guide to the New Zealand Art Market”, published New Holland) in 2012. This book includes chapters on subjects such as Building an Art Collection, Art at Auction, Buying Art for Investment, How to Avoid Fakes and Forgeries, Selling Artwork, How Dealer Galleries Operate, Taking Care of Artwork, Advice for Artists, Conceptual Art, Public Galleries, Funding Agencies and Private Benefactors, How to Find a Bargain and An Overview and History of the Art Market. The book was widely reviewed.

In 2018 Henderson wrote a book detailing the history of toy and games [The Fascinating History of Toys and Games around The World], published New Holland. The book includes over 300 illustrations and focuses on the way in which toys and games reflect history including, design, fashion, historical events, social changes and the development and discovery of the materials used in their manufacture. Complete chapters refer to the discovery and development of plastics and aluminium. Other chapters discuss the influence of many historical events on toymaking such as the “Battle of the Little Big Horn”, the sinking of the Titanic, the discovery of Tutankhamun's tomb and the Moon landing. The author maintains antique toys are not just items that were played with but also inspired many famous inventions and showcase an era or segment of history. The book was released internationally and positively reviewed.

In 2020 Henderson was approached by UNESCO (Jonathon Keats, Curator UNESCO Futures Literacy Project) to provide an essay and information outlining significant toys or games that were produced in New Zealand or Australia which have inspired NZ children during their childhood and formative years.("Some NZ and Australian Toys Dabble with the Future", 31.10.20). Henderson was formally interviewed in November 2020. This information related to UNESCO's plan to establish a virtual and real museum of inspirational toys and games from the 5 continents that represent "past visions of the future that have shaped the present" (JK email to WH 18.10.20)

== Essays and articles ==
Henderson has written for various magazines (and gallery catalogues for the Warwick Henderson Gallery) including articles and essays for Personal Investor Magazine, Home and Building Magazine, Carters Antique Guide and Antique Toy World Magazine:

Investing in Table-Top Toys – Warwick Henderson Finds Riches in the Toy Cupboard” – Signature Magazine, Oct/Nov, 1986, p24-25

“Train Tickets and False Eyelashes – The Art of Investing in Collectibles” – Personal Investment Magazine, May 1987, page 102-103

"The Art of Art Investment", Personal Investment New Zealand Magazine, July 1987, Pages 64 – 66

"Good Paintings with Limited Funds" Personal Investment New Zealand Magazine, August 1987, Pages 126 – 127

"A Compulsive Collector - Warwick Henderson reviews The Andy Warhol Estate Auction held in New York", Signature Magazine, Vol 13, #6, page 16 & 17, 1988

“Appreciating Collectibles” – Personal Investor Magazine, Nov 1988, p45-51

“Fine Art or Fun Ho! - Art Dealer Warwick Henderson Explains...” – NZ Home & Building Magazine, Dec 1990-Jan 1991, p96-97

"Comment – Artex 1990" Home and Building Magazine 1990, December 1990 – January 1991, Page 162

"Antiques – Fine art or Fun Ho" Home and Building Magazine, December 1990 – January 1991 Pages 96 – 97

"New Zealand Toys are FunHo!" Carters Antiques and Collectibles Magazine, March 1992, Pages 64 – 65

"Art Market Shows Buoyancy" Carters Antiques and Collectibles Magazine New Zealand and Australia, July 1992, Page 41

"Triplets – Three Antique Pedal Cars – A True Story" Antique Toy World Magazine, April 1993, Pages 50 – 52

"Pedal Cars at the Oasis, Pedal Cars on the Moon", Antique Toy World Magazine, November 1995, vol 25 311, Pages 72–74

"Introduction – The Toy Show", Published Auckland Museum December 1996

"Born in Te Kopuru", True Tales of Te Kopuru, Edited by Christine Rope, 2018, Pages 75–77
