= Dean Buchanan =

New Zealand painter

Personal details
- Born: 22 November 1953 (age 72) New Zealand
- Domestic partner: Helga Strewe
- Children: Rudolph Axel Buchahan Strewe, Celeste Juno Buchanan Strewe
- Occupation: Abstract and landscape painter
- Website: www.deanbuchanan.co.nz

Dean Leonard Buchanan (born 22 June 1952) is a New Zealand-based abstract and landscape painter. He has exhibited widely throughout New Zealand, as well as in Chile, the US, and Japan. His first solo show in 1978 was at the Outreach Gallery in Ponsonby, Auckland. He has also been involved in many group shows – the first at the age of 19, the "Young Contemporaries" at The Auckland City Art Gallery in 1971.

His paintings are found in public buildings and galleries both in New Zealand and overseas. He has also exhibited in Australia, Japan, Chile, Switzerland and the US.

Buchanan has been outspoken in defence of preserving New Zealand’s natural environment. In January 2007, he succeeded in climbing Aoraki / Mount Cook.

== Solo exhibitions ==
- 1978 Outreach Gallery Auckland New Zealand
- 1979 Little Maidment Theatre Auckland New Zealand
- 1980 100m2 Auckland New Zealand
- 1981 Denis Cohn Gallery Auckland New Zealand
- 1982 Outreach Gallery Auckland New Zealand
- 1982 Little Maidment Theatre Auckland New Zealand
- 1983 Outreach Gallery Auckland New Zealand
- 1984 New Vision Gallery Auckland New Zealand
- 1985 ANZAS Auckland New Zealand
- 1986 Words and Pictures Auckland New Zealand
- 1986 Auckland Society of Arts Auckland New Zealand
- 1987 Waitemata City Arts and Cultural Centre, Auckland, New Zealand
- 1987 Auckland Society of Arts Auckland New Zealand
- 1988 N.Z High Commission Los Angeles US
- 1988 Amy Thomas Gallery Boca Raton US
- 1989 Charlotte H Gallery Auckland New Zealand
- 1990 Gallery 119 Hamilton New Zealand
- 1990 Daikokuya Ginza Tokyo Japan
- 1991 Whangarei Art Gallery Whangarei New Zealand
- 1992 Milford House Dunedin New Zealand
- 1992 Tanishima Gallery Tokyo Japan
- 1993 Warwick Henderson Gallery Auckland New Zealand
- 1994 Milford House Dunedin New Zealand
- 1995 Warwick Henderson Gallery Auckland New Zealand
- 1996 The Pumphouse Gallery Auckland New Zealand
- 1996 Milford House Dunedin New Zealand
- 1996 Warwick Henderson Gallery Auckland New Zealand
- 1997 Lopdell House Gallery, Auckland, New Zealand
- 1997 Miro Gallery Napier New Zealand
- 1998 Warwick Henderson Gallery Auckland New Zealand
- 1999 Milford House Dunedin New Zealand
- 2000 Warwick Henderson Gallery Auckland New Zealand
- 2001 Warwick Henderson Gallery Auckland New Zealand
- 2001 Paciflcart Gallery Zug Switzerland
- 2004 Warwick Henderson Gallery Auckland New Zealand
- 2004 Galerle Romerapotheke Zurich Switzerland
- 2004 West Coast Gallery New Zealand
- 2005 Corbans Art Centre Auckland New Zealand
- 2007 Compendium Gallery Auckland New Zealand
