= Artex =

Trademark; surface coating used for interior decorating, most often found on ceilings

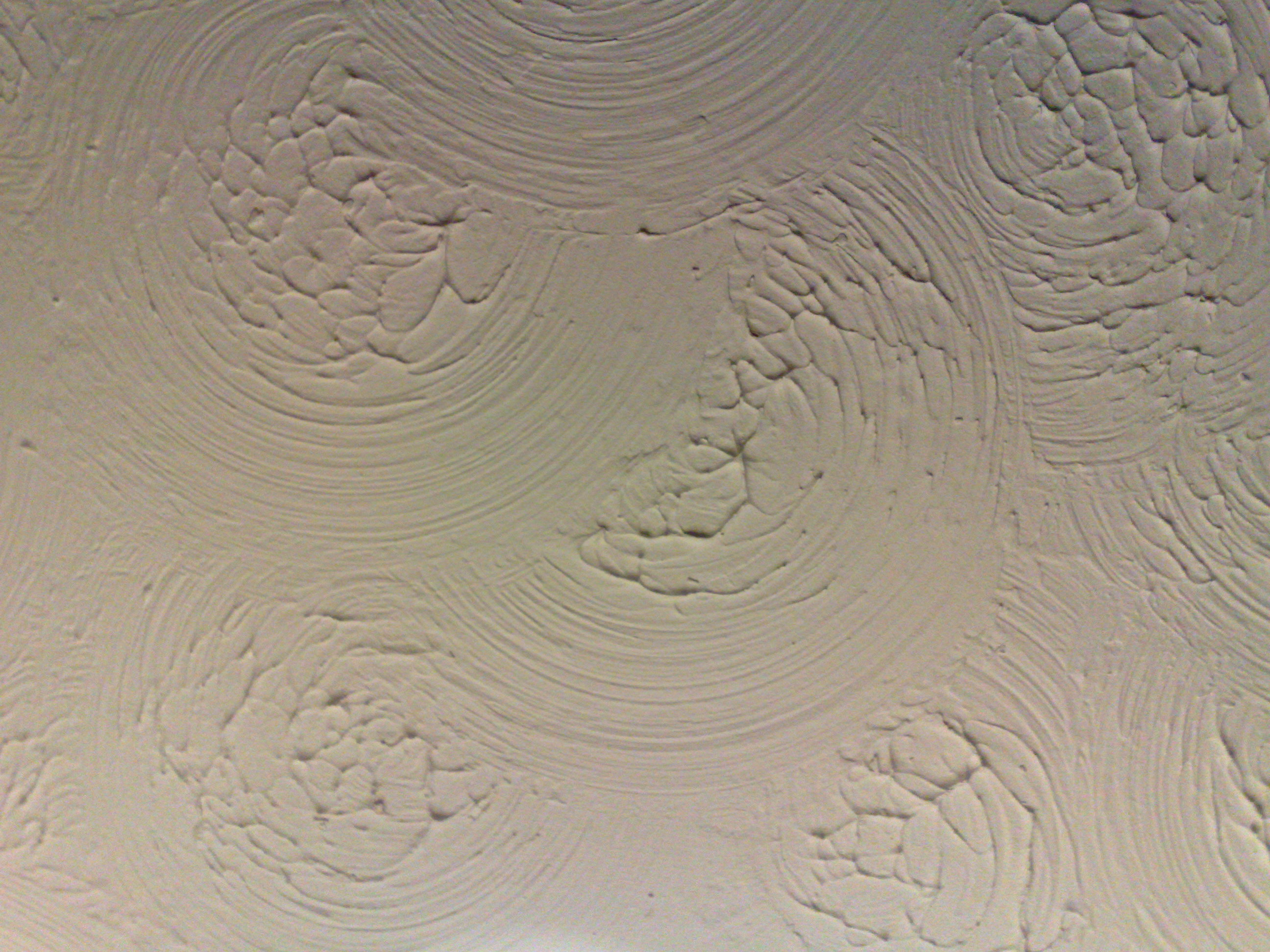
A swirled pattern on a ceiling, made using Artex

Artex is a surface coating used for interior decorating, most often found on ceilings, which allows the decorator to add a texture to it. The name Artex is a trademark of Artex Ltd., a company based in the United Kingdom. The name is a genericised trademark often used to refer to similar products from other manufacturers. Since 2005, the company has belonged to France's Saint-Gobain group.

== Description ==
Artex differs from plaster in that it was marketed as a material intended to receive a textured finish, thus enabling a ceiling to be finished without plastering skills. It was widely used in Britain in the 1970s, mainly with the familiar stippled and swirled patterns. Artex was also occasionally used on walls.

As of 2023 Artex is still sold, but the textured ceiling finishes are much less popular.

One issue with Artex ceilings is that matching the pattern seamlessly when repairing is impossible. The poor appearance of repaired ceilings harmed its popularity. Furthermore, removal of Artex can be rather difficult.

== Health risks ==
Until 1984, the Artex coating was made with white asbestos (Chrysotile) to strengthen it. This material is only harmful when in a powder form, such as when being sanded or while drilling holes, and poses no risk while it is undisturbed on ceilings or walls and covered with emulsion paint.

Even removing more modern non-asbestos coatings can expose the operator to hazardous dust particles. However, older coatings containing asbestos pose a particularly serious hazard. Inhaling microscopic asbestos fibers can cause asbestosis, a fibrosing lung disease; pleural mesothelioma, a cancer of the lining (pleura) of the lung; and peritoneal mesothelioma, a cancer of the lining (peritoneum) of the abdomen. Professional expertise to identify the presence of asbestos is recommended. Only those trained to remove the coating or working with a surface covered with the substance should do so, they should wear effective dust-proof protective clothing and masks, and the area being worked on should be sealed off. Removal of asbestos-containing Artex is covered by the UK's Control of Asbestos Regulations 2012, although in many cases this work falls within exemptions to the licensing requirements and so does not usually require use of a licensed contractor. In cases where the risk is higher, the regulations make it unlawful for a contractor not licensed by the country's Health and Safety Executive to undertake the work.

In the UK, once removed, Artex and any other substance containing asbestos must be disposed of as hazardous waste. If the coating is left alone and coated with paint and undamaged, it may be safe to leave the coating in place and managed by annual inspection.

== See also ==
- Popcorn ceiling
