= John Daly-Peoples =

New Zealand arts critic and correspondent

John Francis Daly-Peoples (born 5 January 1945) is a New Zealand arts critic and correspondent. He is the arts writer The New Zealand Arts Review (www.nzartsreview.org) and previously arts writer for the weekly financial journal, National Business Review (1989–2019).

== Early life and family ==
Daly-Peoples was born in Wellington on 5 January 1945, the son of Lawrence and Monica Daly-Peoples, and was educated at St Patrick's College, Wellington. He went on to study at Victoria University of Wellington and the University of Auckland, completing a Bachelor of Arts degree at the latter institution in 1971. He also completed a Diploma of Teaching at the Auckland College of Education in 1974 and a Bachelor of Town Planning at the University of Auckland in 1981.

In 1969, Daly-Peoples married Linda Ruth Barnett, and the couple had two children before separating. In 2012 he married Candis Eileen Craven.

== Career ==
Daly-Peoples has worked in a number of arts-related areas as writer, teacher, consultant, curator and administrator. He has also been a secondary school art teacher and was a teaching fellow at the Town Planning Department of the University of Auckland from 1979 to 1981, specialising in energy planning and planning for LPG and CNG. As a planner, he provided expert information on LPG and CNG installations as well as historical preservation.

As an arts writer he has covered a range of the arts: visual art, opera, theatre, dance and music. He wrote for the Auckland University student newspaper, Craccum (1968–1973) and had a film review programme on Radio Bosom (bfm) and a book review programme on bfm. He has reviewed New Zealand art exhibitions and performances in the United States, United Kingdom, France, Italy, The Netherlands, Israel, Switzerland, Canada and Germany. He has worked with several companies including Wilkins and Davies, Air New Zealand, Mazda and Team McMillan BMW. He curates the Team McMillan BMW Art Awards as well as commissioning artist to work on BMW bonnets for charity auctions. In his works with Air New Zealand, Daly-Peoples developed an exhibitions programme of major New Zealand artists in the domestic and international Koru Lounges as well as annual exhibitions of art school student work.

Daly-Peoples has curated a number of other exhibitions including the official New Zealand entry in the Valparaiso Biennale (1987), International Poster Exhibition (1988), Elam 1890–1990, (Auckland Museum 1990), From Here to There, a touring exhibition of Pacific Art to Australia, Hawaii, Samoa, Tonga, Niue funded by Creative New Zealand (1997), Toi O Manukau, Works from the Manukau City Art Collection, Fisher Art Gallery (2000), Seen Recently, Work from the Wallace Arts Trust. with exhibitions at Northart and Waiheke Community Art Gallery (2013).

For several years, he has been a member of the Eden Arts community art group, which has initiated a number of successful and continuing art activities including Artists in Eden, The Mt Eden Literary Festival and the Mt Eden Young Artists Award. He has been the lead judge for the Eden Arts, Arts Schools Awards since 2010. He has been a member of the Northern Regional Arts Council (1990–1992) and the Arts Board of Creative New Zealand (1998–2001) as well as chairing the Screen Innovation Fund. He was the director of the Auckland Society of Arts (1981–1987), the Arts Service Manager for Manukau City Council (1993–2003) and the Manager, Arts and Culture (Central) for Auckland Council (2011–2012).

He has written extensively on the arts including the centennial history Elam 1890–1990 and has written chapters on"The Arts and Artists of Mt Eden" and "The Domestic Architecture of Mt Eden" in the publication A History of Mt Eden [Epsom Eden District Historical Society, 2019].

In 1990, Daly-Peoples was awarded the New Zealand 1990 Commemoration Medal, and he was arts columnist of the year in the 1999 Qantas Media Awards.
