= Artex S.A. =

Cuban company involved in the promotion and distribution of artistic works

Artex S.A. is a Cuban company involved in the promotion and distribution of artistic works. Its main divisions are the record label Bis Music, the book publisher Ediciones Cubanas and Comercial Lauros, which commercializes artisanal products. Artex was founded in 1989 as Promociones Artísticas y Literarias and it soon became Cuba's largest chain of record outlets. Previously, the Cuban music industry had been entirely managed by the state-owned EGREM since 1964. Similarly, Artex manages the biggest bookstores in the country.
