= Artex Ltd. =

British Company

- Founded: 1935

Artex Ltd. is an English-based manufacturer of building materials.

== History ==
Artex was started in 1935, with the name Artex coming from "Asbestos Reinforced TEXtured Coating".

Artex became part of the BPB Group of companies in 1966. It merged with Blue Hawk sometime in 1997. Blue Hawk had been bought by the BPB Group in 1972. BPB was in turn purchased by Saint-Gobain, a large building products company based in France in November 2005.

== Brands ==
It owns several brands, some of which have become genericized and are known and recognised as household words. Its brands include:

- Artex Textured Coating
- Gyproc Plasterboard
- Thistle Plaster
- Blue Hawk

== Structure ==
It has its head office and main manufacturing base at Ruddington, Nottinghamshire, with an additional manufacturing site for texture and liquid products in Newhaven, East Sussex.
