= Popcorn ceiling =

Textured ceiling coating

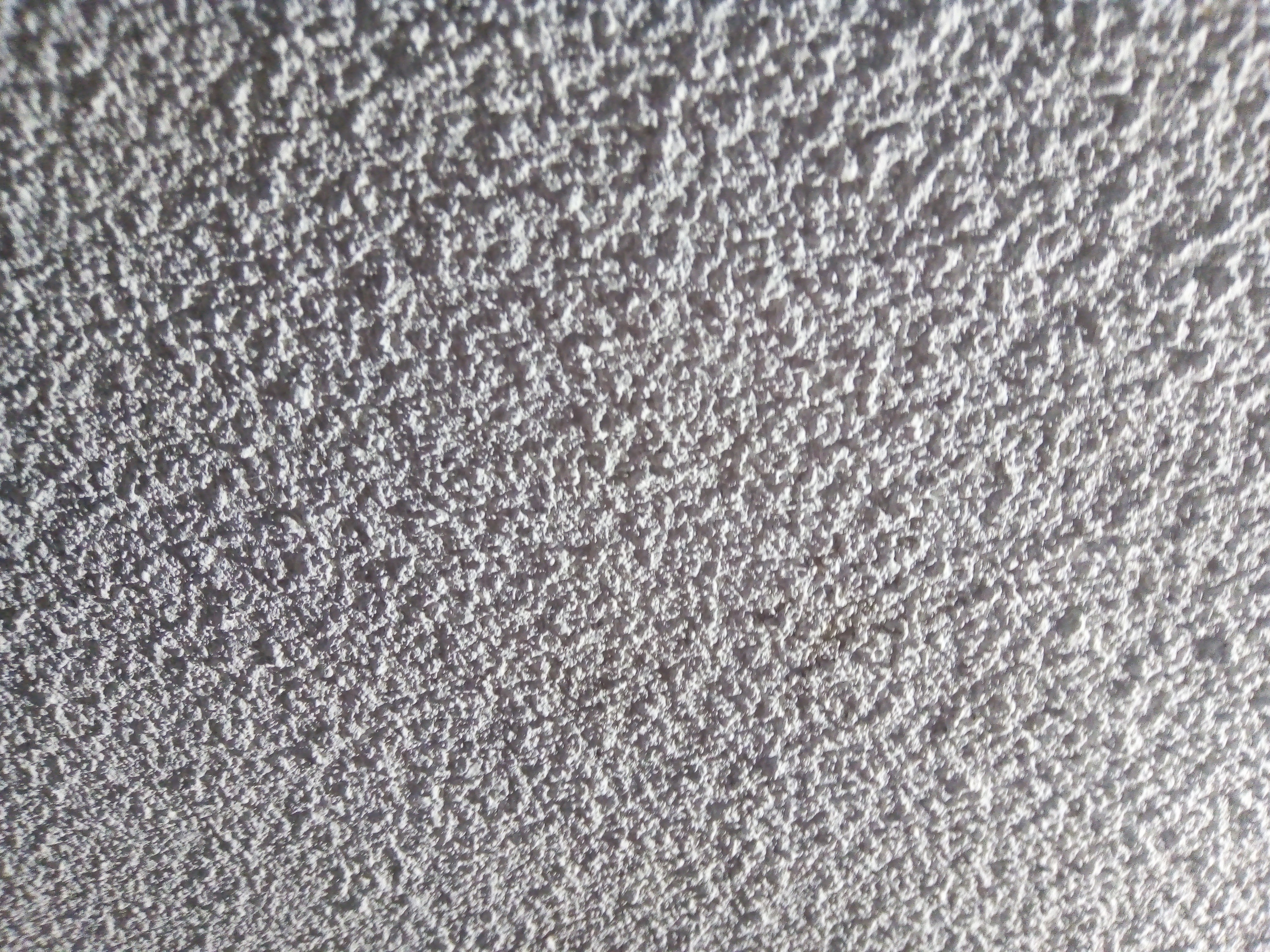
Popcorn ceiling texture

A popcorn ceiling, also known as a stipple ceiling or acoustic ceiling, is a ceiling with one of a variety of spray-on or paint-on treatments. The bumpy surface is created by tiny particles of vermiculite or polystyrene, which gives the ceiling sound-deadening properties. Mixtures are available in fine, medium, and coarse grades.

In many parts of the world, it was the standard for bedroom and residential hallway ceilings for its bright, white appearance, ability to hide imperfections, and acoustic characteristics. In comparison, kitchen, living room and bathroom ceilings would normally be finished in smoother skip-trowel or orange peel texture for their higher durability and ease of cleaning. Popcorn ceilings, in pre-1970s and early formulations, often contained white asbestos fibers. When asbestos was banned in ceiling treatments by the Clean Air Act in the United States in 1963, popcorn ceilings fell out of favor in much of the country. However, in order to minimize economic hardship to suppliers and installers, existing inventories of asbestos-bearing texturing materials were exempt from the ban, so it is possible to find asbestos in popcorn ceilings that were applied through the 1980s. After the ban, popcorn ceiling materials were created using a paper-based or Styrofoam product to create the texture, rather than asbestos. Textured ceilings remain common in residential construction in the United States.

Since the mid-2000s, the popularity of textured popcorn ceilings has diminished significantly across North America. A trend toward more modern, clean-lined design features has influenced home improvement professionals to provide popcorn ceiling removal services. In comparison to smooth ceilings, textured ceilings are generally less reflective of natural light, may harbor more dust and allergens, and may be more difficult to patch and touch up after drywall repair.

The creator of the popcorn ceiling is not widely agreed upon, but brands like Homax were some of the first to make "spray-on popcorn ceiling" for commercial sale.

== See also ==
- Artex
