= Silence compression =

Computer technology

Silence compression is an audio processing technique used to effectively encode silent intervals, reducing the amount of storage or bandwidth needed to transmit audio recordings.

== Overview ==
Silence can be defined as audio segments with negligible sound. Examples of silence are pauses between words or sentences in speech and pauses between notes in music. By compressing the silent intervals, the audio files become smaller and easier to handle, store, and send while still retaining the original sound quality. While techniques vary, silence compression is generally achieved through two crucial steps: detection of the silent intervals and the subsequent compression of those intervals. Applications of silence compression include telecommunications, audio streaming, voice recognition, audio archiving, and media production.

== Techniques ==
=== 1. Trimming ===
Trimming is a method of silence compression in which the silent intervals are removed altogether. This is done by identifying audio intervals below a certain amplitude threshold, indicating silence, and removing that interval from the audio. A drawback of trimming is that it permanently changes the original audio and can cause noticeable artifacts when the audio is played back.

==== a. Amplitude Threshold Trimming ====
Amplitude threshold trimming removes silence through the setting of an amplitude threshold in which any audio segments that fall below this threshold are considered silent and are truncated or completely removed. Some common amplitude threshold trimming algorithms are:

- Fixed Threshold: In a fixed threshold approach, a static amplitude level is selected, and any audio segments that fall below this threshold are removed. A drawback to this approach is that it can be difficult to choose an appropriate fixed threshold, due to differences in recording conditions and audio sources.
- Dynamic Threshold: In a dynamic threshold approach, an algorithm is applied to adjust the threshold dynamically based on audio characteristics. An example algorithm is setting the threshold as a fraction of the average amplitude in a given window. This approach allows for more adaptability when dealing with varying audio sources but requires more processing complexity.

==== b. Energy-Based Trimming ====
Energy-based trimming works through the analysis of an audio signal's energy levels. The energy level of an audio signal is the magnitude of the signal over a short time interval. A common formula to calculate the audio's energy is $E = \sum_{k=1}^N (x(k))^2$, where $E$ is the energy of the signal, $N$ is the samples within the audio signal, and $x(k)$ is the $k$^{th} sample's signal amplitude. Once the energy levels are calculated, a threshold is set in which all energy levels that fall below the threshold are considered to be silent and removed. Energy-based trimming can detect silence more accurately than amplitude-based trimming as it considers the overall power output of the audio as opposed to just the amplitude of the sound wave. Energy-based trimming is often used for voice/speech files due to the need to only store and transmit the relevant portions that contain sound. Some popular energy-based trimming algorithms include the Short-Time Energy (STE) and Zero Crossing Rate (ZCR) methods. Similarly, those algorithms are also used in voice activity detection (VAD) to detect speech activity.

=== 2. Silence Suppression ===
Silence suppression is a technique used within the context of Voice over IP (VoIP) and audio streaming to optimize the rate of data transfer. Through the temporary reduction of data in silent intervals, Audio can be broadcast over the internet in real-time more efficiently.

==== a. Discontinuous Transmission (DTX) ====
DTX works to optimize bandwidth usage during real-time telecommunications by detecting silent intervals and suspending the transmission of those intervals. Through continuously monitoring the audio signal, DTX algorithms can detect silence based on predefined criteria. When silence is detected, a signal is sent to the receiver which stops the transmission of audio data. When speech/sound is resumed, audio transmission is reactivated. This technique allows for uninterrupted communication while being highly efficient in the use of network resources.

=== 3. Silence Encoding ===
Silence Encoding is essential for the efficient representation of silent intervals without the removal of silence altogether. This allows for the minimization of data needed to encode and transmit silence while upholding the audio signal's integrity. There are several encoding methods used for this purpose:

==== a. Run-Length Encoding (RLE) ====
RLE works to detect repeating identical samples in the audio and encodes those samples in a way that is more space-efficient. Rather than storing each identical sample individually, RLE stores a single sample and keeps count of how many times it repeats. RLE works well in encoding silence as silent intervals often consist of repeated sequences of identical samples. The reduction of identical samples stored subsequently reduces the size of the audio signal.

==== b. Huffman Coding ====
Huffman coding is an entropy encoding method and variable-length code algorithm that assigns more common values with shorter binary codes that require fewer bits to store. Huffman coding works in the context of silence compression by assigning frequently occurring silence patterns with shorter binary codes, reducing data size.

=== 4. Differential Encoding ===
Differential encoding makes use of the similarity between consecutive audio samples during silent intervals by storing only the difference between samples. Differential encoding is used to efficiently encode the transitions between sound and silence and is useful for audio samples where silence is interspersed with active sound. Some differential encoding algorithms include:

==== a. Delta Modulation ====
Delta modulation quantizes and encodes differences between consecutive audio samples by encoding the derivative of the audio sample's amplitude. By storing how the audio signal changes over time rather than the samples itself, the transition from silence to sound can be captured efficiently. Delta modulation typically uses a one-bit quantization mechanism, where 1 indicates an increase in the sample size and 0 indicates a decrease. While this allows for efficient use of bandwidth or storage, it is unable to provide high-fidelity encoding of low-amplitude signals.

==== b. Delta-Sigma Modulation ====
Delta-Sigma modulation is a more advanced variant of Delta modulation which allows for high-fidelity encodings for low-amplitude signals. This is done through quantizing at a high oversampling rate, allowing for a precise encoding of slight changes in the audio signal. Delta-sigma modulation is used in situations where maintaining a high audio fidelity is prioritized.

== Applications ==
The reduction of audio size from silence compression has uses in numerous applications:

1. Telecommunications: The reduction of silent transmissions in telecommunication systems such as VoIP allows for more efficient bandwidth use and reduced data costs.
2. Audio Streaming: silence compression minimizes data usage during audio streaming, allowing for high-quality audio to be broadcast efficiently over the internet.
3. Audio Archiving: silence compression helps to conserve space needed to store audio while maintaining audio fidelity.
