= Silence suppression =

Telephony process

The term silence suppression is used in telephony to describe the process of not transmitting information over the network when one of the parties involved in a telephone call is not speaking, thereby reducing bandwidth usage.

Voice is carried over a digital telephone network by converting the analog signal to a digital signal which is then packetized and sent electronically over the network. The analogue signal is re-created at the receiving end of the network. When one of the parties does not speak, background noise is picked up and sent over the network. This is inefficient as this signal carries no useful information and thus, bandwidth is wasted.

Given that typically only one party in a conversation speaks at any one time, silence suppression can achieve overall bandwidth savings in the order of 50% over the duration of a telephone call. (While both parties may sometimes speak at the same time, there are times when both parties are silent.)

Silence suppression is achieved by recognizing the lack of speech through a speech processing mechanism called voice activity detection (VAD) which dynamically monitors background noise and sets a corresponding speech detection threshold. This technique is also known as speech activity detection (SAD).

A similar principle is used for Discontinuous Reception and discontinuous transmission in GSM mobile telephone systems.

For further bandwidth gains, silence suppression is normally done after echo cancellation.

== Drawbacks ==
Background noise detection may be difficult in some circumstances (relatively low speech level, or relatively high background noise level, for example).

When silence suppression is active, the line appears to have gone dead at the other (egress) end of the call. For this reason, so-called comfort noise needs to be generated to compensate for the lack of background noise. The ingress end must therefore signal the egress end that silence suppression is in effect. For best results, the level of comfort noise being generated on egress should match that of the background noise at the ingress end.

Speech activity detection must occur very quickly, otherwise clipping might occur.

Speech activity detection does not work well on non-speech calls (fax or modem communication, for example).

Thus, silence suppression is generally an optional feature on telephony devices. In some cases, it is automatically turned on based on the characteristics of a call.

== See also ==
- Comfort noise
- Talkspurt
- Voice activity detection
