= Talkspurt =

In digital telephony, a talkspurt is a continuous segment of speech between silent intervals where only background noise can be heard. Segmenting speech streams into talkspurts allows bandwidth to be conserved by not sending excess data in silent intervals, and also allows synchronization, buffering and other parameters of the communications system to be readjusted in the intervals between talkspurts.

The term "talkspurt" is not a recent coinage: it was in use as long ago as 1959, during the development of time-assignment speech interpolation systems.

The talkspurt/silence distinction is used in a wide variety of digital speech transport systems, including GSM and packetized speech systems such as voice over IP.

Silence between talkspurts may sometimes be replaced by comfort noise.

== See also ==
- Voice activity detection
- Silence suppression
- Discontinuous transmission
