= Enhanced full rate =

Speech coding standard

Enhanced Full Rate or EFR or GSM-EFR or GSM 06.60 is a speech coding standard that was developed in order to improve the quality of GSM.

Enhanced Full Rate was developed by Nokia and the Université de Sherbrooke (Canada). In 1995, ETSI selected the Enhanced Full Rate voice codec as the industry standard codec for GSM/DCS.

== Technology ==
The sampling rate is 8000 sample/s leading to a bit rate for the encoded bit stream of 12.2 kbit/s. The coding scheme is the so-called Algebraic Code Excited Linear Prediction Coder (ACELP). The encoder is fed with data consisting of samples with a resolution of 13 bits left justified in a 16-bit word. The three least significant bits are set to 0. The decoder outputs data in the same format.

The Enhanced Full Rate (GSM 06.60) technical specification describes the detailed mapping between input blocks of 160 speech samples in 13-bit uniform PCM format to encoded blocks of 244 bits and from encoded blocks of 244 bits to output blocks of 160 reconstructed speech samples. It also specifies the conversion between A-law or μ-law (PCS 1900) 8-bit PCM and 13-bit uniform PCM. This part of specification also describes the codec down to the bit level, thus enabling the verification of compliance to the part to a high degree of confidence by use of a set of digital test sequences. These test sequences are described in GSM 06.54 and are available on disks.

This standard is defined in ETSI ETS 300 726 (GSM 06.60). The packing is specified in ETSI Technical Specification TS 101 318. ETSI has selected the Enhanced Full Rate voice codec as the industry standard codec for GSM/DCS in 1995. Enhanced Full Rate was also chosen as the industry standard in US market for PCS 1900 GSM frequency band.

== Licensing and patent issues ==
The Enhanced Full Rate incorporate several patents. It uses the patented ACELP technology, which is licensed by the VoiceAge Corporation.

Enhanced Full Rate was developed by Nokia and the Université de Sherbrooke (Canada).

== See also ==
- Half Rate
- Full Rate
- Adaptive Multi-Rate (AMR)
- Adaptive Multi-Rate Wideband (AMR-WB)
- Extended Adaptive Multi-Rate - Wideband (AMR-WB+)
- Comparison of audio coding formats
