= Presence (sound recording) =

"Silence" recorded at a location or space when no instruments play or voices speak

In filmmaking and television production, presence, also known as room tone, or simply room sound, is the "silence" recorded at a location or space when no dialogue is spoken. Presence is similar to ambience, but is distinguished by a lack of explicit background noise.

Each location possesses a unique presence determined by the microphone's position relative to the space's boundaries. A microphone placed in different parts of the same room will capture two distinct presences. This is because of the unique spatial relationship between the microphone and boundaries such as walls, ceilings, and floors, and other objects in a room.

Presence is recorded during the production stage of filmmaking. It is used to help create the film sound track, where presence may be intercut with dialogue to smooth out any sound edit points. The sound track "going dead" would be perceived by the audience not as silence, but as a failure of the sound system. For this reason presence is normally recorded—like dialogue—in mono, with the microphone in the same position and orientation as the original dialogue recording. In the sound edit, presence occupies the same track as the dialogue to which it applies.

== See also ==
- Comfort noise
