= DCMES =

DCMES may refer to:

- Digital Circuit Multiplication Equipment
- Dublin core
