= Q50 =

Q50 may refer to:

- Q50 (New York City bus)
- BloodHound Q50, American rapper (2004–2026)
- Infiniti Q50, an automobile
- ITU-T Recommendation Q.50, a telecommunications standard
- Qaf (surah), the 50th surah of the Quran
