= G.729.1 =

ITU-T Recommendation

- G.729-based embedded variable bit-rate coder: An 8-32 kbit/s scalable wideband coder bitstream interoperable with G.729
- Status: In force
- Year started: 2006
- Latest version: (03/13); March 2013
- Organization: ITU-T
- Committee: ITU-T Study Group 16
- Related standards: G.711, G.729
- Domain: audio compression
- License: Non-free
- Website: https://www.itu.int/rec/T-REC-G.729.1

G.729.1 is an 8-32 kbit/s embedded speech and audio codec providing bitstream interoperability with G.729, G.729 Annex A and G.729 Annex B. Its official name is G.729-based embedded variable bit rate codec: An 8-32 kbit/s scalable wideband coder bitstream interoperable with G.729. It was introduced in 2006.

This codec has been designed to provide better quality and more flexibility than the existing ITU-T G.729 speech coding standard. G.729.1 is scalable in bit rate, acoustic bandwidth and complexity. In addition it offers various encoder and decoder modes, including the support of both 8 and 16 kHz input/output sampling frequency, compatibility with G.729B, and reduced algorithmic delay. The bitstream of G.729.1 is structured into 12 hierarchical layers. The first layer (or core layer) at 8 kbit/s follows the G.729 format. The second layer (adds 4 kbit/s for a total of 12 kbit/s) is a narrowband enhancement layer. The third layer (2 kbit/s for a total of 14 kbit/s) is a bandwidth extension layer. Further layers (in 2 kbit/s steps) are wideband enhancement layers. The G.729.1 output bandwidth is 5-4000 Hz at 8 and 12 kbit/s, and 50–7000 Hz from 14 to 32 kbit/s. G.729.1 is also known as G.729 Annex J and G.729EV where EV stands for Embedded Variable (bit rate).

The G.729.1 algorithm is based on a three-stage coding structure: embedded code-excited linear prediction (CELP) coding of the lower band (50–4000 Hz), parametric coding of the higher band (4000–7000 Hz) by Time-Domain Bandwidth Extension (TDBWE), and enhancement of the full band (50–7000 Hz) by a predictive transform coding technique referred to as time-domain aliasing cancellation (TDAC) or modified discrete cosine transform (MDCT) coding.

== See also ==
- List of codecs
- G.729
