= Acoustic transmission =

Transmission of sounds through and between materials

Example of airborne and structure-borne transmission of sound, where Lp is sound pressure level, A is attenuation, P is acoustical pressure, S is the area of the wall [m²], and τ is the transmission coefficient

Acoustic transmission is the transmission of sounds through and between materials, including air, wall, and musical instruments.

The degree to which sound is transferred between two materials depends on how well their acoustical impedances match.

== In musical instrument design ==
Musical instruments are generally designed to radiate sound effectively. A high-impedance part of the instrument, such as a string, transmits vibrations through a bridge (intermediate impedance) to a sound board (lower impedance). The soundboard then moves the still lower-impedance air. Without bridge and soundboard, the instrument does not transmit enough sound to the air, and is too quiet to be performed with. An electric guitar has no soundboard; it uses a microphone pick-up and artificial amplification. Without amplification, electric guitars are very quiet.

== Stethoscope ==
Stethoscopes roughly match the acoustical impedance of the human body, so they transmit sounds from a patient's chest to the doctor's ear much more effectively than the air does. Putting an ear to someone's chest would have a similar effect.

== Building acoustics ==
Acoustic transmission in building design refers to a number of processes by which sound can be transferred from one part of a building to another. Typically these are:

1. Airborne transmission - a noise source in one room sends air pressure waves which induce vibration to one side of a wall or element of structure setting it moving such that the other face of the wall vibrates in an adjacent room. Structural isolation therefore becomes an important consideration in the acoustic design of buildings. Highly sensitive areas of buildings, for example recording studios, may be almost entirely isolated from the rest of a structure by constructing the studios as effective boxes supported by springs. Air tightness also becomes an important control technique. A tightly sealed door might have reasonable sound reduction properties, but if it is left open only a few millimeters its effectiveness is reduced to practically nothing. The most important acoustic control method is adding mass into the structure, such as a heavy dividing wall, which will usually reduce airborne sound transmission better than a light one.
2. Impact transmission - a noise source in one room results from an impact of an object onto a separating surface, such as a floor and transmits the sound to an adjacent room. A typical example would be the sound of footsteps in a room being heard in a room below. Acoustic control measures usually include attempts to isolate the source of the impact, or cushioning it. For example, carpets will perform significantly better than hard floors.
3. Flanking transmission - a more complex form of noise transmission, where the resultant vibrations from a noise source are transmitted to other rooms of the building usually by elements of structure within the building. For example, in a steel framed building, once the frame itself is set into motion the effective transmission can be pronounced.

== See also ==
- Acoustic absorption
- Acoustic attenuation
- Architectural acoustics
- Attenuation coefficient
- Flanking transmission
- Noise pollution
- Soundproofing
- Sound pressure
- Sound reflection
- Sound transmission class
