= Ambience (sound recording) =

Soundscape of a given location or space

In filmmaking, ambience (also known as atmosphere, atmos, or background) consists of the sounds of a given location or space. It is the opposite of "silence". Ambience is similar to presence, but is distinguished by the existence of explicit background noise in ambience recordings, as opposed to the perceived "silence" of presence recordings.

Every location has distinct and subtle sounds created by its environment. These sound sources can include wildlife, wind, music, rain, running water, thunder, rustling leaves, distant traffic, aircraft and machinery noise, the sound of distant human movement and speech, creaks from thermal contraction, air conditioning and plumbing noises, fan and motor noises, and harmonics of mains power.

Reverberation will further distort these already faint sounds, often beyond recognition, by introducing complex patterns of peaks and nulls in their frequency spectrum and blurring their temporal characteristics. Finally, sound absorption can cause high frequencies to be rolled off, dulling the sound further.

Ambience is normally recorded in stereo by the sound department during the production stage of filmmaking. It is used to provide a movie location with sonic space and normally occupies a separate track in the sound edit.

== See also ==
- Acoustic signature
- Ambient noise level
- Environmental noise
- Filmmaking
- Presence (sound recording)
