= Flanking transmission =

Transmission of sound through indirect pathways in buildings

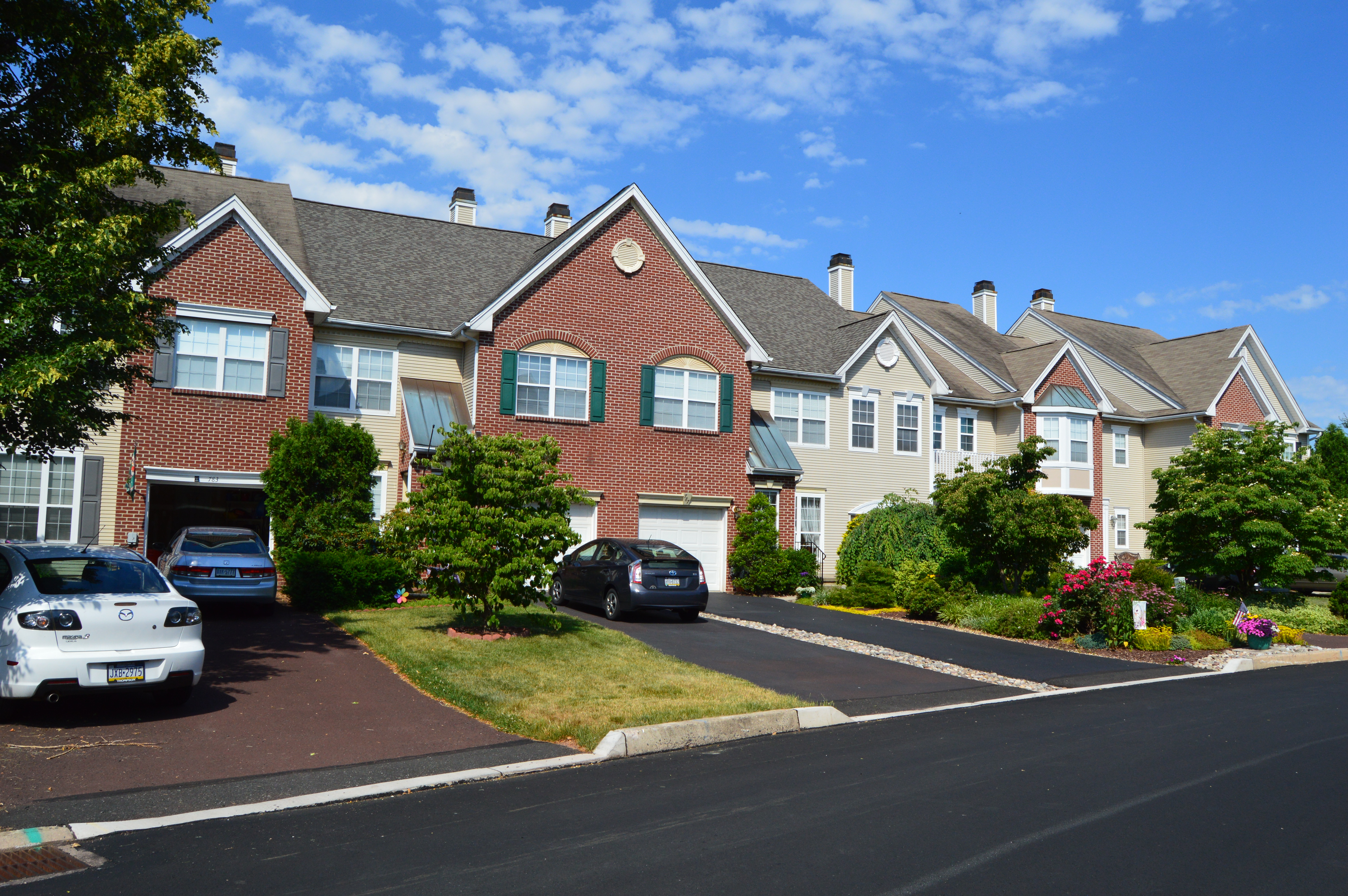
Terraced houses, duplexes, and townhouses often contain shared structural elements that can facilitate flanking transmission.

Flanking transmission, also known as noise flanking, a flanking path, or indirect sound transmission, is the transmission of sound between spaces through indirect pathways within a building that bypass the primary separating element, such as a wall, floor, or ceiling. In architectural acoustics, sound may travel through connected structural elements, gaps, ductwork, pipes, ceilings, floors, or other parts of a building, reducing the effectiveness of a partition's intended sound insulation.

The significance of flanking transmission depends on the design and construction details of the building and is an important consideration in acoustic design and noise control engineering. Several methods have been developed to predict the apparent sound reduction index of building constructions. Established prediction models are generally reliable for heavy, homogeneous, and isotropic structures, but are less suitable for lightweight constructions, whose critical frequencies often fall within or above the frequency range of interest.

== Significance in building acoustics ==
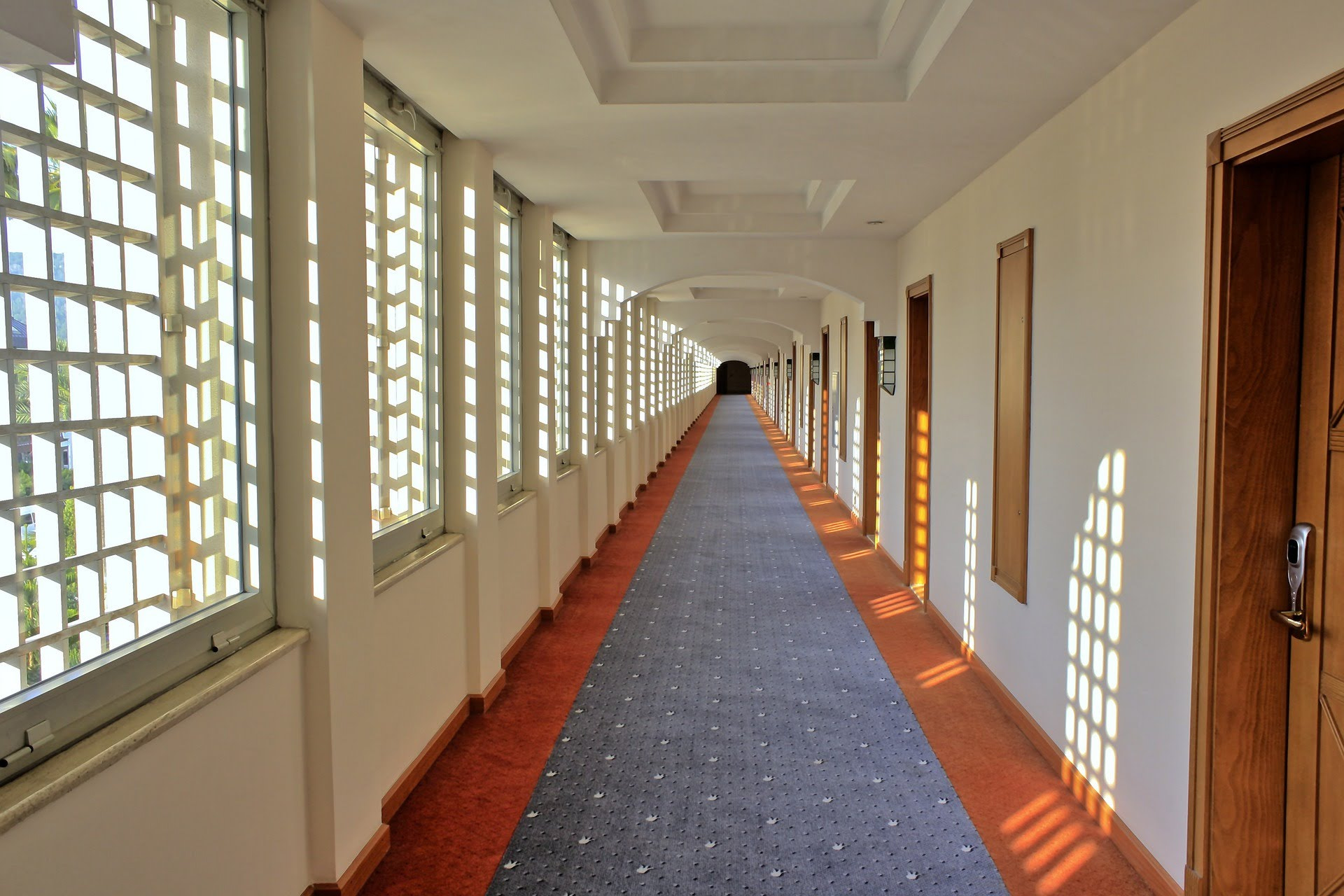
Apartment buildings and hotels are particularly susceptible to flanking transmission due to shared walls, floors, ceilings, and service corridors.

Sound can travel through a building by both direct and indirect paths. Direct sound transmission occurs when sound passes straight through a separating element such as a wall, floor, or ceiling. For example, noise from a television in one apartment may be heard in an adjacent dwelling if the dividing wall provides insufficient sound insulation. In such cases, the sound is transmitted directly through the wall itself. Direct transmission is often the simplest form of noise transfer to address, as improvements can be made to the specific building element through which the sound is passing. Indirect sound transmission occurs when sound bypasses the primary separating structure and travels through adjacent building elements, such as floors, ceilings, or connecting walls. As a result, noise that appears to be coming through a particular wall may also be reaching the listener via alternative pathways within the building structure. These indirect routes can significantly reduce the effectiveness of sound-insulation measures and are a common cause of acoustic-performance failures in buildings.

Flanking transmission is one of the principal mechanisms of sound transmission in buildings, alongside airborne sound and structure-borne sound. Because sound energy can circumvent a nominal barrier through adjacent construction elements, the overall acoustic performance of a building may be significantly lower than that predicted from the sound-insulation rating of a wall or floor alone. The phenomenon is an important consideration in the design of residential, commercial, and industrial buildings, especially medium-density housing, where controlling noise transmission between rooms is a key objective. Building codes in many jurisdictions establish minimum requirements for sound insulation between residential dwellings. Compliance with these standards is often assessed during the building approval process, although the extent to which acoustic performance is verified may vary.

=== Occupant perception ===
In some cases, occupants of apartments and other multi-unit buildings report hearing noise from neighbouring units despite compliance with minimum code requirements. Such issues may arise when sound travels through indirect pathways. Because sound transmitted through flanking paths may appear to originate from locations other than its true source, occupants can experience difficulty identifying the origin of noises within a building. Sounds may seem to emanate from walls, ceilings, floors, or other building elements rather than from the original source. This mislocalisation of sound has been recognised as a source of confusion in residential buildings and may contribute to reports of unexplained noises.

Because flanking transmission can make sounds appear to originate from unexpected locations within a building, it may complicate sound localisation. Low-frequency sounds, including infrasound, are particularly difficult to locate and have been linked to reports of unexplained or seemingly paranormal experiences in some buildings.

== Common pathways ==
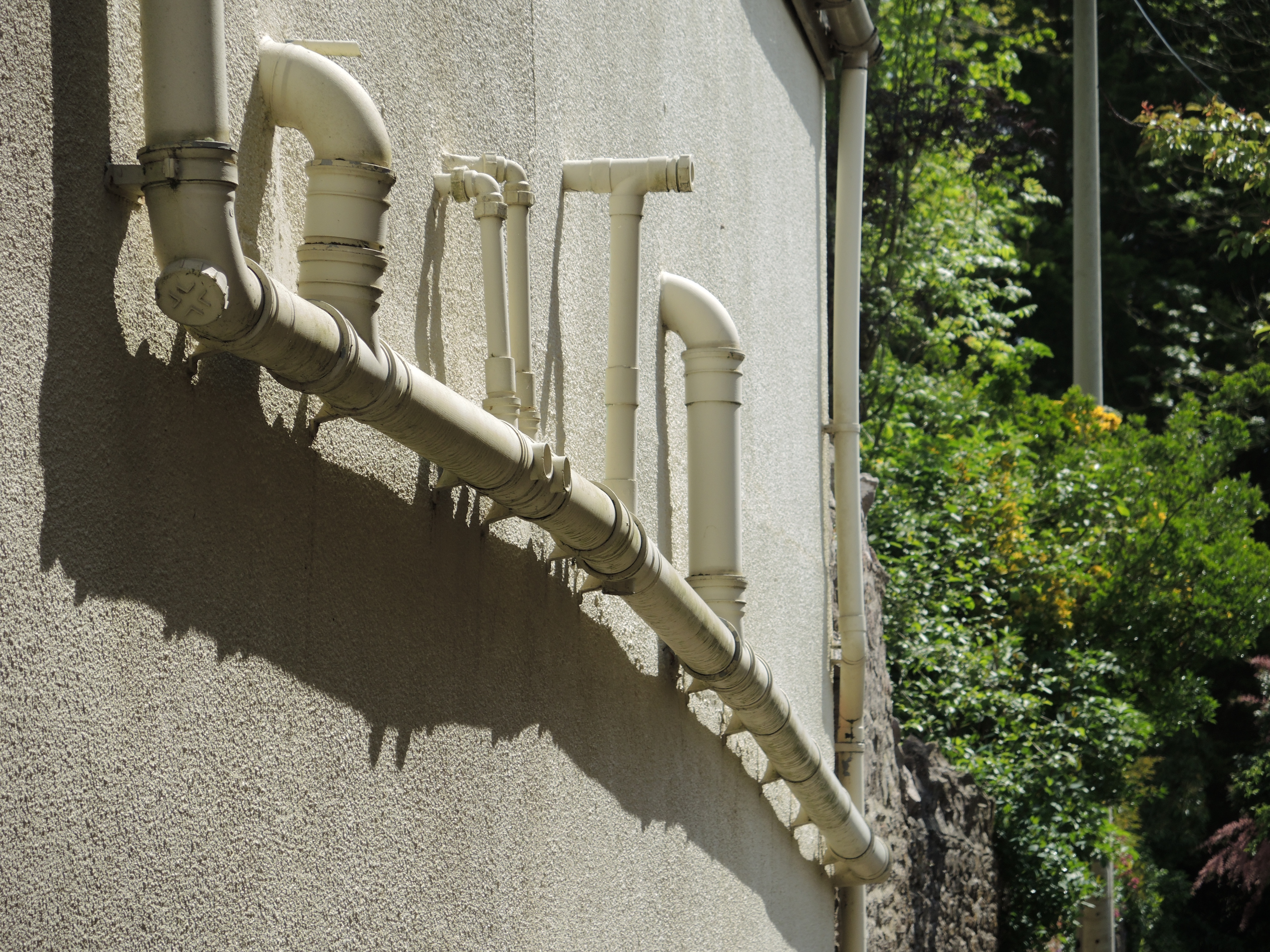
Service penetrations, such as plumbing pipes, are common pathways for flanking transmission in buildings.

Common flanking transmission pathways include:

- Ceiling cavities and roof spaces
- Floors and floor joist cavities
- Windows and glazing systems
- Electrical fixtures and outlets, including light switches, telephone outlets, and recessed lighting
- Shared structural elements such as floorboards, floor joists, drywall partitions, concrete floors, and masonry walls
- Structural junctions, including wall-floor and wall-ceiling connections
- Plumbing chases and service penetrations
- Gaps around the ends of partitions and adjacent wall assemblies

These pathways can allow sound to bypass the primary separating barrier, reducing the overall acoustic performance of a building and diminishing the effectiveness of otherwise well-insulated walls, floors, and ceilings. All flanking transmission involving vibration is structure-borne sound transmission.

== Prediction and assessment ==
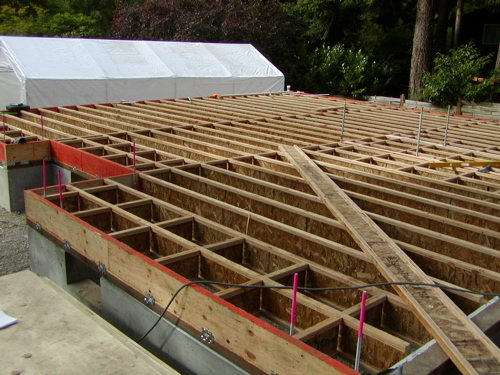
Floor joists can transmit sound and vibration between adjoining rooms, contributing to flanking transmission.

Three principal approaches have been proposed for predicting flanking sound transmission at frequencies below the critical frequency. The first is a direct prediction method based on databases of measured flanking-transmission performance for individual transmission paths. The second involves modifying existing standardised prediction methods through the calculation of resonant sound-transmission factors. However, many techniques for calculating these factors are designed for single-leaf, homogeneous, isotropic building elements and are therefore difficult to apply to more complex constructions. The third approach relies on measuring or predicting radiation efficiency, including both resonant and non-resonant components, as well as the radiation efficiency generated by airborne diffuse-field excitation. Unlike the other methods, this approach can be applied to complex building elements when the relevant radiation efficiencies can be measured or accurately predicted. These methods have been the subject of ongoing research aimed at improving the prediction of flanking sound transmission in lightweight and complex building systems.

Research has shown that the prediction of flanking sound transmission can be more difficult in lightweight and non-homogeneous building systems than in conventional massive constructions. A 2014 study of an insulated clay-block building system found that internal damping, resonant behaviour, and the location of measurement points can significantly influence the determination of vibration transmission across structural junctions. The study concluded that detailed vibration measurements and numerical modelling may be required to accurately assess flanking transmission in complex building assemblies.

According to the Australian Building Codes Board (ABCB), flanking transmission is a significant factor affecting the real-world acoustic performance of buildings. Even when walls and floors satisfy laboratory sound-insulation requirements, sound may bypass these elements through adjoining structural components, junctions, ceilings, floors, service penetrations, and other indirect pathways. Consequently, the apparent sound insulation experienced by occupants may be substantially lower than the rated performance of the separating building element alone. The control of flanking transmission is therefore an important consideration in the design, construction, and regulatory assessment of residential and other noise-sensitive buildings.

In standardised flanking calculations, the sound paths across a junction between two rooms are labelled by two letters: the first (upper case) denotes the element excited on the source-room side and the second (lower case) denotes the element that radiates into the receiving room, with D/d for the direct (separating) element and F/f for a flanking element. This gives four path types at each junction—Dd (direct transmission through the separating element), Df and Fd (one direct and one flanking element), and Ff (transmission along the flanking elements on both sides). The overall sound insulation between the rooms is obtained by energy summation of the direct path and all flanking paths.
