= Background noise =

Sound other than the sound being monitored (primary sound)

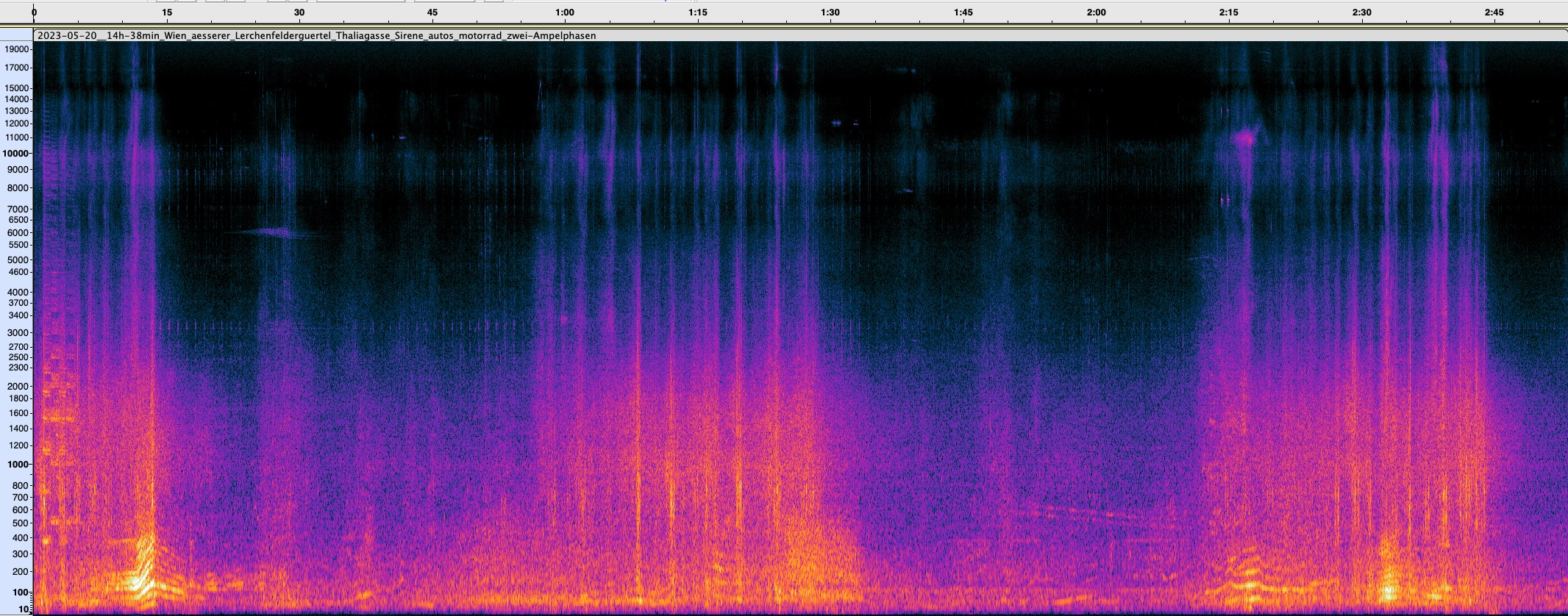
Spectrogram of street traffic noise

Background noise or ambient noise is any sound other than the sound being monitored (primary sound). Background noise is a form of noise pollution or interference. Background noise is an important concept in setting noise levels.

== Description ==
Background noise is a form of noise pollution or interference; it is any sound other than the sound being monitored (primary sound). Background noises include environmental noises such as water waves, traffic noise, alarms, extraneous speech, bioacoustic noise from animals, and electrical noise from devices such as refrigerators, air conditioning, power supplies, and motors.

== Importance ==
Background noise is an important concept in setting noise levels. The prevention or reduction of background noise is important in the field of active noise control. It is an important consideration with the use of ultrasound (e.g. for medical diagnosis or imaging), sonar, and sound reproduction. Background noise can also affect concentration.

== Other uses ==
- In astronomy, background noise or cosmic background radiation is electromagnetic radiation from the sky with no discernible source.
- In information architecture, irrelevant, duplicate or incorrect information may be called background noise.
- In physics and telecommunication, background signal noise can be detrimental or in some cases beneficial. The study of avoiding, reducing or using signal noise is information theory.
- In telephony, artificial comfort noise is used as a substitute for natural background noise, to fill in artificial silence created by discontinuous transmission systems using voice activity detection.

== See also ==
- 4'33"
- Ambient noise level
- Electronic noise
- The Hum
- Colors of noise
- Sound masking
