= IS-641 =

TIA/EIA standard IS-641 is a speech coding standard released in 1996 and used in some computer and telecommunications networks in the United States. The main usage was in the U.S. TDMA networks defined by IS-136. The bit rate of the speech codec is 7.4 kbit/s. This codec is the same as the 7.4 kbit/s mode in the AMR speech codec. The standard was superseded by TIA/EIA-136-410's release in 1999.
