= Time-assignment speech interpolation =

Technique to increase capacity of analog phone cables

In telecommunications, a time-assignment speech interpolation (TASI) was an analog technique used on certain long transmission links to increase voice transmission capacity.

TASI was invented by Bell Labs in the early 1960s to increase the capacity of transatlantic telephone cables. It was one of their first applications requiring electronic switching of voice circuits.

Later digital circuit multiplication equipment included TASI as a feature, not as distinct hardware.

== Operation ==
TASI takes advantage of the fact that in typical person-person conversation, speech in a single direction occurs for approximately 40% of the time, the remaining time being occupied with pauses and/or silence. Statistical analysis demonstrated that for an average voice channel usage of 40%, over 74 speech conversations could be handled using 37 full Duplex speech circuits thereby doubling potential revenue for a small capital outlay relative to a highly expensive cable. e.g. £12.5 million (£263 million as of 2014) cost of the TAT-1 cable on which TASI was implemented.

TASI worked by switching additional users onto any voice channel temporarily idled because an original user has stopped speaking. When the original user resumes speaking, that user would, in turn, be switched to any channel that happened to be idle. The speech detector function is called voice activity detection. Clipping or loss of speech would occur for all conversations that needed to be assigned to an available idle channel and in practice lasted at least 17 ms whilst information required to re-connect both parties was signalled by the TASI control circuits. An additional freezeout period lasting between 0 and 500 ms would depend on the instantaneous loading of voice circuits. In actual use, these delays presented few problems in typical conversations.

One of the issues with using this type of technology was that the users listening on an idled channel can sometimes hear the conversation that has been switched onto it. Generally the sound heard was of very low volume and individual words are not distinguishable. See also crosstalk for a similar phenomenon in telecommunications. Another potential issue was ensuring that non-voice type circuits (e.g. Music or radio type circuits where pauses would occur infrequently) were not routed via TASI speech channels since these could seriously degrade the level of service where callers would encounter frequent clipped speech and breaks in the conversation.

== See also ==
- Talkspurt
