= Discontinuous reception =

Discontinuous reception (DRX) is a method used in mobile communication to conserve the battery of the mobile device.

The mobile device and the network negotiate phases in which data transfer occurs. During other times the device turns its receiver off and enters a low power state.

This is usually a function designed into the protocol that allows this to happen - most notably how the transmission is structured - for example in slots with headers containing address details so that devices can listen to these headers in each slot to decide whether the transmission is relevant to them or not. In this case, the receiver only has to be active at the beginning of each slot to receive the header, conserving battery life.

Other techniques include polling, whereby the device is placed into standby for a given amount of time and then a beacon is sent by the access point or base station periodically which indicates if there is any waiting data for it. This is used in 802.11 wireless networks when compatible access cards and access points negotiate a power saving mode arrangement.

A hybrid of the above techniques could be used in reality.

== See also ==
- Discontinuous transmission
