= Sound masking =

Addition of sound to reduce distraction

Sound masking is the inclusion of generated sound (commonly, though inaccurately, referred to as "white noise" or "pink noise") into an environment to mask unwanted sound. It relies on auditory masking. Sound masking is not a form of active noise control (noise cancellation technique); however, it can reduce or eliminate the perception of sound. Sound masking is applied to an entire area to improve acoustical satisfaction, thus improving the acoustical privacy of the space. This can help an individual focus and thereby enhance productivity.

== Architectural acoustics ==
Sound masking means controlling background sounds in a developed environment. It is significant and prioritizes modifying the background sound (in contrast to background noise); however, there is substantial evidence produced and published by Banneker (BBN) and Kavanaugh indicating that acoustical satisfaction within a space cannot be guaranteed without consideration of the three principal parameters of architectural acoustical design, formalized and established in the early 1900s by Sabine. The three principal parameters are as follows (known as the 'ABC's' of architectural acoustics):

- A for Absorption – Sufficient (but not in excess) absorption in the developed environment.
- B for Blocking – Sufficient isolation of the developed environment.
- C for Control – Control of background sound levels in the developed environment.

No single technique is effective in addressing every sound transmission path (direct, reflected, diffracted, transmitted) and each varies in performance on a case-by-case basis.

== Sound masking systems ==
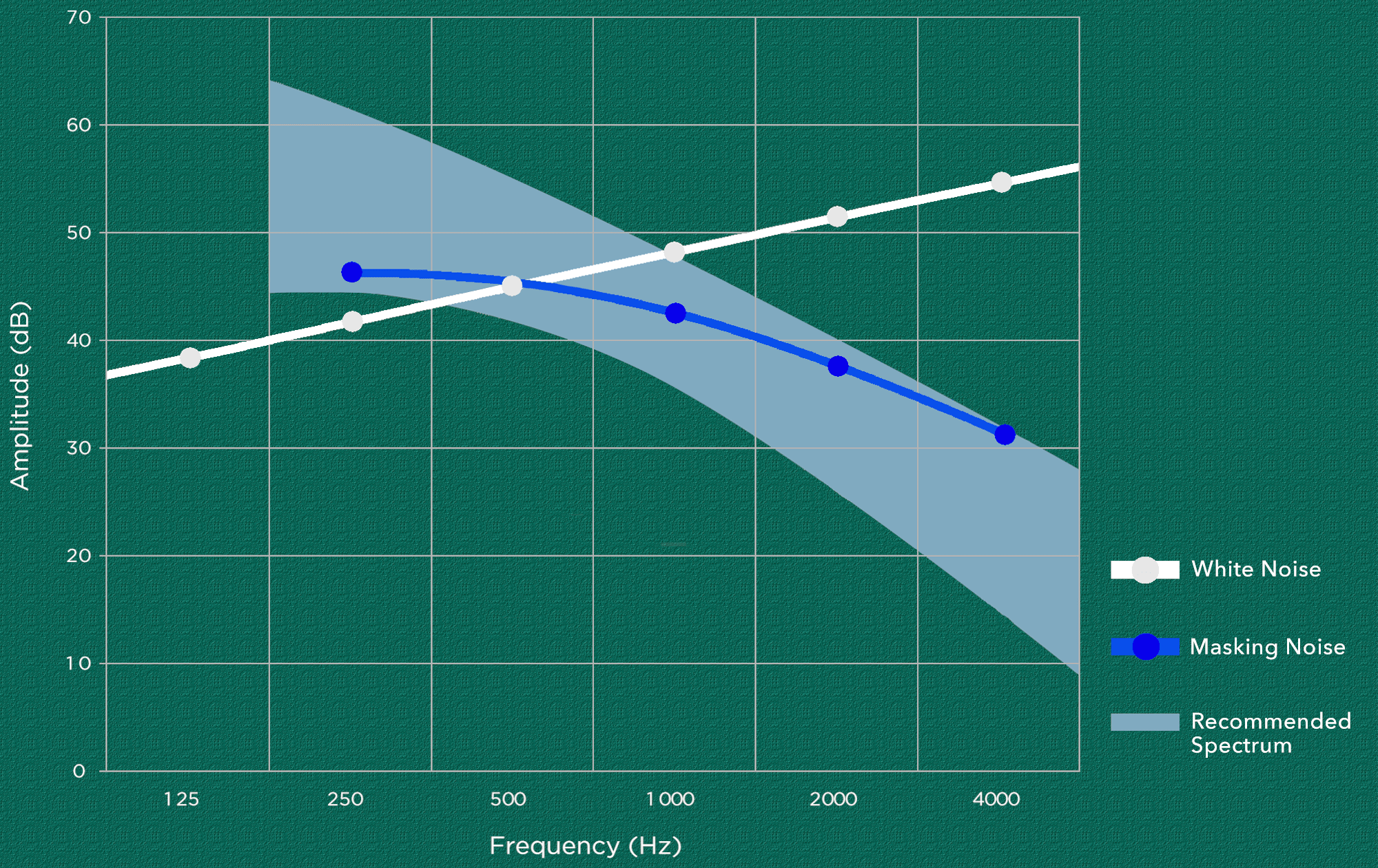
How sound masking differs from white noise

A sound masking system can be used to reduce the impression of intruding sound (reducing annoyance, distraction) and improve acoustic privacy (including speech privacy). However, there is a fundamental misconception in the deployment of a sound masking system in treating areas where there is a failure to appreciate the difference between the perception of privacy and speech privacy.

Sound masking systems are often relied upon as a basis of design with Sound Transmission Class (STC, as supported by ASTM E336) or Noise Isolation Class (NIC, as supported by ASTM E336) to ensure an appropriate level of privacy between contiguous rooms. Various organizations (ASTM, ASA/ANSI, GBI, LEED, ASHRAE, WELL, etc.) define unique categories for labeling acoustical zones with purpose and/or function.

Typical classifications consider:

- Open office plans – open offices can be either too quiet (where someone dropping a pen in the next cubicle is distracting) – or too noisy (where the conversations of others in the office make it impossible to concentrate). Open offices can benefit from sound masking because the added sound covers existing sounds in the area – making workers less distracted and more productive.
- Private offices – private offices and other enclosed spaces often appear to provide privacy but do not. Many times, walls are lightweight and do not extend to the ceiling deck, but only to the ceiling tile. In these cases, sound can easily travel through partitions or over the walls. Sound masking can be provided in adjacent private offices, or in hallways outside of private offices, to ensure that confidential conversations remain confidential.
- Public spaces – sound masking is useful for reception areas, pharmacies, waiting rooms, and financial institutions. Sound masking is provided in the area where conversations should not be heard – not necessarily in the area where the conversation is taking place. For instance, a psychiatrist would not want those in the waiting room to overhear a private conversation with a patient, so sound masking is provided in the waiting area, but not in the psychiatrist's office. Similarly, hospitals may employ a sound masking system in public areas to safeguard patient medical histories and achieve compliance with local regulations.

Sound masking is an effective solution in masking intruding noise. The masking sound spectrum (National Research Council of Canada's COPE curve) is generated to be comfortable and elevated in level to be conducive to acoustical privacy in the built and occupied environment and can be specified up to 48dBA. It may be used to mask unwanted noise such as intermittent sound from machinery (within the overall limits and spectra).

Sound masking seeks to reduce the intelligibility of sound from a source by reducing the signal-to-noise ratio. It is an effective solution to promote compliance with regulations that require measures to be taken to prevent verbal communication from being overheard, such as HIPAA (US) and GLBA (US) in medicine and finance respectively.

However, the masking sound produced by an electroacoustic system may also be disruptive if the sound masking system is improperly designed, improperly commissioned, or not verified by a professional acoustician.

=== Exteriors ===
Several cases exist where sound masking has been successfully installed for exterior applications, the most common target of concern being roadway noise. In one example application, a large artificial waterfall was constructed as part of the garden exterior of an urban hotel in Santa Rosa, California. The waterfall cascades down an extensive wall approximately four meters in height and functions both for sound masking and as a physical barrier to road noise.

=== In plenum ===
The plenum is the space between a "dropped" ceiling and the upper deck to the floor. In plenum sound masking systems, which employ a network of loudspeakers located completely within the plenum, were the first such systems developed and have been in use since the 1960s. Plenum-based speakers typically range 4–10 inches (10–25 cm) in diameter and generally face upwards, towards the upper deck. This is done to reflect sound from the speakers to broaden, as much as possible, the footprint from the speaker in the work area. This promotes a spatially uniform delivery of sound, reducing the perception of directivity.

As with any commercial-grade sound masking system, an in-plenum sound masking system requires proper layout design, commissioning, and verification of the performance. Disregarding the importance of any of these stages in implementation will result in a sound masking system that does not perform according to the specifications of an acoustician. Only the most sophisticated sound masking systems can control the background sound level and spectra of masking sound accurately and precisely throughout a space, made possible only with the smallest zones (spatial limits around a speaker) and sophisticated electronics and software.

Uniformity can be achieved by adjusting the acoustic output of individual or a small groups of speakers. Adjustments routinely include changes in the output volume and output spectra of individual speakers. To provide this adjustment capability, additional system electronics for individual speakers or a small groups of speakers are required.

=== Direct field ===
Direct field sound masking systems have been in use since the late 1990s. The name takes after the mechanics of sound transmission which considers the "direct sound path" from the loudspeaker emitted towards the recipients (listeners) underneath. Initially used as an accessory for open office cubicles, direct field systems have been fully integrated into at least one open office furniture system and have been designed to be installed both in dropped ceilings and in offices without any absorptive ceiling systems. When installed in dropped ceilings, direct field systems use speakers that are mounted facing down. When a ceiling tile is not available, they are mounted facing down on any available structure, sending the masking noise directly into the intended space.

Theoretically, a direct field system would benefit from speakers that are omnidirectional, meaning that they transmit energy equally in essentially all directions. However, direct field systems require tighter arrays of loudspeakers given the polarity of the emission of sound. It is a misconception that direct field speakers preclude the need for sound level adjustment or spectral tuning.

== See also ==
- Comfort noise
- Noise health effects
- Noise mitigation
- Noise Reduction Coefficient
- Noise regulation
- White noise machine
