= Zero-crossing rate =

Rate at which a signal changes

The zero-crossing rate (ZCR) is the rate at which a signal changes from positive to zero to negative or from negative to zero to positive. Its value has been widely used in both speech recognition and music information retrieval, being a key feature to classify percussive sounds.

ZCR is defined formally as

$$zcr = \frac{1}{T-1}\sum_{t=1}^{T-1}\left| \mathrm{sgn}[s(t)]-\mathrm{sgn}[s(t-1)]\right|$$

where $s$ is a signal of length $T$ and $\mathrm{sgn}(x)$ is a sign function defined as:

$$\mathrm{sgn}(x)=\begin{cases}1,\quad x\geq 0\\0, \quad x<0\end{cases}$$

In some cases only the "positive-going" or "negative-going" crossings are counted, rather than all the crossings, since between a pair of adjacent positive zero-crossings there must be a single negative zero-crossing.

For monophonic tonal signals, the zero-crossing rate can be used as a primitive pitch detection algorithm. Zero crossing rates are also used for Voice activity detection (VAD), which determines whether human speech is present in an audio segment or not.

== See also ==
- Zero crossing
- Digital signal processing
