= Digital circuit multiplication equipment =

Digital circuit multiplication equipment (DCME) was a type of voice compression equipment that is installed at both ends of a long-distance telecommunication link, typically a link via communications satellite or submarine communications cable. The main characteristics of DCME are defined in ITU-T recommendation G.763. DCME consists of a time-assignment speech interpolation (TASI) voice interpolation stage, which is a form of statistical multiplexor applied to voiceband signals, and a low rate encoding stage which exploits correlation between successive voiceband samples on an individual input channel to reduce the transmitted bitrate from that required by PCM of equivalent quality.

Under heavy loading conditions, for example when a large number of channels show continuous activity due to voiceband data or Group III facsimile signals, the voice interpolation may not be able to operate within a satisfactory quality range – discontinuous signals such as speech being affected by competitive clipping of the initial part of the activity. To combat this DCME may incorporate Dynamic Load Control on a range of input channels. Dynamic load control is a form of back busying to the telephone switch.

The DCME's functionality, from the point of view of the telephone switch attached to its local interface, is standardised by ITU-T Recommendation Q.50.

== See also ==
- Time-assignment speech interpolation
