= Extended Adaptive Multi-Rate – Wideband =

Audio codec

Extended Adaptive Multi-Rate – Wideband (AMR-WB+)
- Internet media type: audio/amr-wb+, audio/3gpp
- Type of format: Audio
- Contained by: 3GP
- Extended from: AMR-WB

Extended Adaptive Multi-Rate – Wideband (AMR-WB+) is an audio codec that extends AMR-WB. It adds support for stereo signals and higher sampling rates. Another main improvement is the use of transform coding (transform coded excitation – TCX) additionally to ACELP. This greatly improves the generic audio coding. Automatic switching between transform coding and ACELP provides both good speech and audio quality with moderate bit rates.

As AMR-WB operates at internal sampling rate 12.8 kHz, AMR-WB+ also supports various internal sampling frequencies ranges from 12.8 kHz to 38.4 kHz. AMR-WB uses 16 kHz sampling frequency with a resolution of 14 bits left justified in a 16-bit word. AMR-WB+ uses 16/24/32/48 kHz sampling frequencies with a resolution of 16 bits in a 16-bit word.

3GPP originally developed the AMR-WB+ audio codec for streaming and messaging services in Global System for Mobile communications (GSM) and Third Generation (3G) cellular systems. Its primary target applications are Packet-Switched Streaming service (PSS), Multimedia Messaging Service (MMS) and Multimedia Broadcast and Multicast Service (MBMS).

File storage of AMR-WB+ encoded audio is specified within the 3GP container format, 3GPP-defined ISO-based multimedia file format defined in 3GPP TS 26.244.

The AMR-WB+ codec has a wide bit-rate range, from 5.2 to 48 kbit/s. Mono rates are scalable from 5.2 to 36 kbit/s, and stereo rates are scalable from 6.2 to 48 kbit/s, reproducing bandwidth up to 20 kHz (approaching CD quality). Moreover, it provides backward compatibility with AMR wideband.

== Software support ==
In September 2005, VoiceAge Corporation announced availability of AMR-WB+ decoder in Helix DNA Client.

== Licensing and patent issues ==
AMR-WB+ compression incorporate several patents of Nokia Corporation, Telefonaktiebolaget L. M. Ericsson and VoiceAge Corporation. VoiceAge Corporation is the License Administrator for the AMR and AMR-WB+ patent pools. VoiceAge also accepts submission of patents for determination of their possible essentiality to these standards.

The initial fee for applications using "real-time channels" with AMR-WB+ is $6,500. Minimum annual royalty shall be $10,000, excluding the initial fee in year 1 of the license agreement.

AMR-WB+ monaural decoder in a category of personal computer products is licensed for free. Stereo AMR-WB+ decoder for personal computer products is licensed for $0.30.

== See also ==
- Adaptive Multi-Rate (AMR)
- Adaptive Multi-Rate Wideband (AMR-WB)
- 3GP
- Comparison of audio coding formats
- RTP audio video profile
