= Comfort noise =

Synthetic background noise

Comfort noise (or comfort tone) is synthetic background noise used in radio and Wireless communications to fill the artificial silence in a transmission resulting from voice activity detection or from the audio clarity of modern digital lines.

Some modern telephone systems (such as wireless and VoIP) use voice activity detection (VAD), a form of squelching where low volume levels are ignored by the transmitting device. In digital audio transmissions, this saves bandwidth of the communications channel by transmitting nothing when the source volume is under a certain threshold, leaving only louder sounds (such as the speaker's voice) to be sent. However, improvements in background noise reduction technologies can occasionally result in the complete removal of all noise. Although maximizing call quality is of primary importance, exhaustive removal of noise may not properly simulate the typical behavior of terminals on the PSTN system.

== Issues with silence ==
The result of receiving total silence, especially for a prolonged period, has a number of unwanted effects on the listener, including the following:

- the listener may believe that the transmission has been lost, and therefore hang up prematurely
- the speech may sound "choppy" (see noise gate) and difficult to understand
- the sudden change in sound level can be jarring to the listener.

To counteract these effects, comfort noise is added, usually on the receiving end in wireless or VoIP systems, to fill in the silent portions of transmissions with artificial noise.

== Noise ==
Generated comfort noise is at a low but audible volume level, and can vary based on the average volume level of received signals to minimize jarring transitions.

In many VoIP products, users may control how VAD and comfort noise are configured, or disable the feature entirely.

As part of the RTP audio video profile, RFC 3389 defines a standard for distributing comfort noise information in VoIP systems.

=== Examples ===
Many radio stations broadcast birdsong, city-traffic or other atmospheric comfort noise during periods of deliberate silence. For example, in the UK, a two-minute silence is observed on Remembrance Sunday; during this time, a live recording of ambient sound from London - where ceremonies to mark Remembrance Sunday each year are held - can be heard. This is to reassure the listener that the station is on-air, but primarily to prevent silence detection systems at transmitters from automatically starting backup tapes of music (designed to be broadcast in the case of transmission link failure).

During the siege of Leningrad, the beat of a metronome was used as comfort noise on the Leningrad radio network, indicating that the network was still functioning.

== Related concepts ==
A similar concept is that of sidetone, the effect of sound that is picked up by a telephone's mouthpiece and introduced (at low level) into the earpiece of the same handset, acting as feedback.

== See also ==
- Ambient noise
- Talkspurt
- Discontinuous transmission (DTX)
- Presence (sound recording)
- Sound masking
- ASMR
