= Discontinuous transmission =

Discontinuous transmission (DTX) is a means by which a mobile telephone is temporarily shut off or muted while the phone lacks a voice input.

== Misconception ==
A common misconception is that DTX improves capacity by freeing up TDMA time slots for use by other conversations. In practice, the unpredictable availability of time slots makes this difficult to implement. However, reducing interference is a significant component in how GSM and other TDMA based mobile phone systems make better use of the available spectrum compared to older analog systems such as Advanced Mobile Phone System (AMPS) and Nordic Mobile Telephone (NMT). While older network types theoretically allocated two 25–30 kHz channels per conversation, in practice some radios would cause interference on neighbouring channels making them unusable, and a single radio may broadcast too strong an oval signal pattern to let nearby cells reuse the same channel.

GSM combines short packet sizes, frequency hopping, redundancy, power control, digital encoding, and DTX to minimize interference and the effects of interference on a conversation. In this respect, DTX indirectly improves the over-all capacity of a network.

== Packet radio systems ==
In packet radio systems such as GPRS/EDGE, it is possible to combine DTX with capacity increase when VoIP is used for telephony. In such cases, resources freed up when one user is in silence can be used to serve another user. The increase of the number of users will contribute to the interference level. Systems that use voice codecs such as AMR can reduce vocoder rate adaptively to better combat interference.

Systems based upon CDMA air interfaces such as IS-95/CDMA2000, and most forms of UMTS, can use a form of implied DTX by usage of a variable rate codec such as AMR. As with the packet radio systems above, when one side of the conversion is silent, the amount of transmitted data is minimized. Again, the effect is reduced interference.

In wireless transmitters, VAD is sometimes called voice-operated transmission (VOX).

== Technical details ==
- SP flag = 0 indicates SID (Silence Insertion Descriptor) frame
- SP flag = 1 indicates speech frame

Speech frame = 260 samples

Transmit side

- TX DTX handle performs speech encoding, comfort noise computation, voice activity detection
- TX Radio Subsystem (RSS):

Performs SP flag monitoring and Channel coding

Hangover period

After the transition from VAD=1 to VAD=0, a "hangover period" of N+1 consecutive frames is required to make a new updated SID frame available. The bursts are directly passed to RSS with SP=1.

Background noise spikes can often be confused with the speech frame and hence, in order to nullify this issue, a check list for SID computation is Nelapsed >23, old SID is utilized with VAD=0.

Once after the end of speech SID is computed it is continuously passed to the RSS marked with SP=0 as long as VAD=0.

If a SID (SP=0) is chosen for transmission is stolen for FACCH signaling than the subsequent frame is scheduled for transmission.

Receive side

- BFI=0 Meaningful information bit
- BFI=1 Not Meaningful information bit

A FACCH frame in not considered as a meaningful information and should be transmitted with BFI=1

Traffic frames aligned with SACCH multi frame have TAF (time alignment flag)=1

RX DTX handler performs speech decoding and comfort noise computation.

RX Radio subsystem

Performs Error Correction and Detection and SID frame detection

Whenever a good speech frame is detected the RX DTX handler shall pass directly to speech decoder. Whenever a lost speech or lost SID frames are detected the substitution or mutation shall be applied. Whenever a valid SID frame result in comfort noise generation. In case of invalid SID frame after consecutive Speech frames the last valid SID frame will be applicable.

== See also ==
- Discontinuous reception
- Comfort noise
- Voice activity detection
